

384001–384100 

|-bgcolor=#E9E9E9
| 384001 ||  || — || October 20, 2008 || Kitt Peak || Spacewatch || — || align=right | 1.1 km || 
|-id=002 bgcolor=#E9E9E9
| 384002 ||  || — || October 20, 2008 || Kitt Peak || Spacewatch || GEF || align=right | 3.2 km || 
|-id=003 bgcolor=#d6d6d6
| 384003 ||  || — || October 20, 2008 || Kitt Peak || Spacewatch || — || align=right | 4.5 km || 
|-id=004 bgcolor=#E9E9E9
| 384004 ||  || — || September 19, 2003 || Kitt Peak || Spacewatch || — || align=right | 1.5 km || 
|-id=005 bgcolor=#E9E9E9
| 384005 ||  || — || October 20, 2008 || Mount Lemmon || Mount Lemmon Survey || — || align=right | 1.9 km || 
|-id=006 bgcolor=#E9E9E9
| 384006 ||  || — || October 20, 2008 || Mount Lemmon || Mount Lemmon Survey || — || align=right | 1.2 km || 
|-id=007 bgcolor=#E9E9E9
| 384007 ||  || — || October 20, 2008 || Mount Lemmon || Mount Lemmon Survey || — || align=right | 2.2 km || 
|-id=008 bgcolor=#E9E9E9
| 384008 ||  || — || September 23, 2008 || Kitt Peak || Spacewatch || EUN || align=right | 1.3 km || 
|-id=009 bgcolor=#E9E9E9
| 384009 ||  || — || October 21, 2008 || Kitt Peak || Spacewatch || — || align=right | 1.8 km || 
|-id=010 bgcolor=#E9E9E9
| 384010 ||  || — || October 1, 2003 || Kitt Peak || Spacewatch || GEF || align=right | 1.6 km || 
|-id=011 bgcolor=#E9E9E9
| 384011 ||  || — || October 21, 2008 || Kitt Peak || Spacewatch || — || align=right | 2.0 km || 
|-id=012 bgcolor=#E9E9E9
| 384012 ||  || — || October 21, 2008 || Kitt Peak || Spacewatch || AEO || align=right | 1.1 km || 
|-id=013 bgcolor=#E9E9E9
| 384013 ||  || — || October 21, 2008 || Kitt Peak || Spacewatch || — || align=right | 2.2 km || 
|-id=014 bgcolor=#E9E9E9
| 384014 ||  || — || October 21, 2008 || Kitt Peak || Spacewatch || — || align=right | 2.1 km || 
|-id=015 bgcolor=#E9E9E9
| 384015 ||  || — || October 21, 2008 || Kitt Peak || Spacewatch || — || align=right | 2.2 km || 
|-id=016 bgcolor=#d6d6d6
| 384016 ||  || — || October 21, 2008 || Kitt Peak || Spacewatch || CHA || align=right | 1.9 km || 
|-id=017 bgcolor=#E9E9E9
| 384017 ||  || — || October 23, 2008 || Kitt Peak || Spacewatch || AGN || align=right data-sort-value="0.92" | 920 m || 
|-id=018 bgcolor=#E9E9E9
| 384018 ||  || — || October 8, 2008 || Kitt Peak || Spacewatch || — || align=right | 1.2 km || 
|-id=019 bgcolor=#E9E9E9
| 384019 ||  || — || September 29, 2008 || Catalina || CSS || — || align=right | 2.7 km || 
|-id=020 bgcolor=#E9E9E9
| 384020 ||  || — || October 22, 2008 || Lulin Observatory || LUSS || — || align=right | 2.8 km || 
|-id=021 bgcolor=#E9E9E9
| 384021 ||  || — || October 25, 2008 || Socorro || LINEAR || — || align=right | 1.6 km || 
|-id=022 bgcolor=#E9E9E9
| 384022 ||  || — || September 24, 2008 || Mount Lemmon || Mount Lemmon Survey || — || align=right | 1.7 km || 
|-id=023 bgcolor=#E9E9E9
| 384023 ||  || — || October 27, 2008 || Bisei SG Center || BATTeRS || — || align=right | 2.2 km || 
|-id=024 bgcolor=#E9E9E9
| 384024 ||  || — || October 6, 2008 || Kitt Peak || Spacewatch || — || align=right | 2.2 km || 
|-id=025 bgcolor=#E9E9E9
| 384025 ||  || — || October 22, 2008 || Kitt Peak || Spacewatch || — || align=right | 2.9 km || 
|-id=026 bgcolor=#E9E9E9
| 384026 ||  || — || October 22, 2008 || Kitt Peak || Spacewatch || — || align=right | 1.7 km || 
|-id=027 bgcolor=#E9E9E9
| 384027 ||  || — || October 22, 2008 || Kitt Peak || Spacewatch || AER || align=right | 1.4 km || 
|-id=028 bgcolor=#E9E9E9
| 384028 ||  || — || October 22, 2008 || Kitt Peak || Spacewatch || — || align=right | 1.9 km || 
|-id=029 bgcolor=#E9E9E9
| 384029 ||  || — || October 22, 2008 || Kitt Peak || Spacewatch || WIT || align=right data-sort-value="0.99" | 990 m || 
|-id=030 bgcolor=#d6d6d6
| 384030 ||  || — || October 22, 2008 || Kitt Peak || Spacewatch || — || align=right | 2.9 km || 
|-id=031 bgcolor=#d6d6d6
| 384031 ||  || — || October 2, 2008 || Mount Lemmon || Mount Lemmon Survey || EOS || align=right | 2.0 km || 
|-id=032 bgcolor=#E9E9E9
| 384032 ||  || — || October 23, 2008 || Kitt Peak || Spacewatch || — || align=right | 1.7 km || 
|-id=033 bgcolor=#E9E9E9
| 384033 ||  || — || October 23, 2008 || Mount Lemmon || Mount Lemmon Survey || AGN || align=right | 1.1 km || 
|-id=034 bgcolor=#E9E9E9
| 384034 ||  || — || April 8, 2002 || Kitt Peak || Spacewatch || — || align=right | 1.4 km || 
|-id=035 bgcolor=#d6d6d6
| 384035 ||  || — || October 23, 2008 || Mount Lemmon || Mount Lemmon Survey || KOR || align=right | 1.2 km || 
|-id=036 bgcolor=#E9E9E9
| 384036 ||  || — || October 24, 2008 || Kitt Peak || Spacewatch || AGN || align=right | 1.1 km || 
|-id=037 bgcolor=#E9E9E9
| 384037 ||  || — || October 24, 2008 || Kitt Peak || Spacewatch || — || align=right | 2.0 km || 
|-id=038 bgcolor=#E9E9E9
| 384038 ||  || — || October 24, 2008 || Kitt Peak || Spacewatch || — || align=right | 1.4 km || 
|-id=039 bgcolor=#E9E9E9
| 384039 ||  || — || September 22, 2008 || Kitt Peak || Spacewatch || WIT || align=right | 1.0 km || 
|-id=040 bgcolor=#E9E9E9
| 384040 ||  || — || October 24, 2008 || Mount Lemmon || Mount Lemmon Survey || AST || align=right | 1.5 km || 
|-id=041 bgcolor=#E9E9E9
| 384041 ||  || — || October 25, 2008 || Mount Lemmon || Mount Lemmon Survey || — || align=right | 2.3 km || 
|-id=042 bgcolor=#E9E9E9
| 384042 ||  || — || October 25, 2008 || Mount Lemmon || Mount Lemmon Survey || — || align=right | 2.1 km || 
|-id=043 bgcolor=#E9E9E9
| 384043 ||  || — || September 22, 2008 || Mount Lemmon || Mount Lemmon Survey || — || align=right | 2.2 km || 
|-id=044 bgcolor=#E9E9E9
| 384044 ||  || — || October 28, 2008 || Socorro || LINEAR || — || align=right | 1.8 km || 
|-id=045 bgcolor=#E9E9E9
| 384045 ||  || — || October 26, 2008 || Tzec Maun || R. Apitzsch || — || align=right | 1.6 km || 
|-id=046 bgcolor=#E9E9E9
| 384046 ||  || — || September 6, 2008 || Siding Spring || SSS || — || align=right | 2.2 km || 
|-id=047 bgcolor=#E9E9E9
| 384047 ||  || — || October 23, 2008 || Kitt Peak || Spacewatch || — || align=right | 2.1 km || 
|-id=048 bgcolor=#E9E9E9
| 384048 ||  || — || October 24, 2008 || Catalina || CSS || — || align=right | 2.3 km || 
|-id=049 bgcolor=#E9E9E9
| 384049 ||  || — || October 25, 2008 || Kitt Peak || Spacewatch || ADE || align=right | 2.3 km || 
|-id=050 bgcolor=#E9E9E9
| 384050 ||  || — || October 26, 2008 || Mount Lemmon || Mount Lemmon Survey || — || align=right | 1.4 km || 
|-id=051 bgcolor=#E9E9E9
| 384051 ||  || — || October 1, 2008 || Catalina || CSS || — || align=right | 2.4 km || 
|-id=052 bgcolor=#E9E9E9
| 384052 ||  || — || October 26, 2008 || Kitt Peak || Spacewatch || — || align=right | 2.0 km || 
|-id=053 bgcolor=#E9E9E9
| 384053 ||  || — || October 27, 2008 || Kitt Peak || Spacewatch || MRX || align=right data-sort-value="0.99" | 990 m || 
|-id=054 bgcolor=#E9E9E9
| 384054 ||  || — || October 28, 2008 || Kitt Peak || Spacewatch || GEF || align=right | 1.4 km || 
|-id=055 bgcolor=#E9E9E9
| 384055 ||  || — || October 28, 2008 || Kitt Peak || Spacewatch || — || align=right | 2.1 km || 
|-id=056 bgcolor=#E9E9E9
| 384056 ||  || — || October 28, 2008 || Kitt Peak || Spacewatch || AGN || align=right | 1.3 km || 
|-id=057 bgcolor=#E9E9E9
| 384057 ||  || — || October 28, 2008 || Mount Lemmon || Mount Lemmon Survey || — || align=right | 1.6 km || 
|-id=058 bgcolor=#E9E9E9
| 384058 ||  || — || October 8, 2008 || Catalina || CSS || — || align=right | 1.9 km || 
|-id=059 bgcolor=#E9E9E9
| 384059 ||  || — || October 28, 2008 || Mount Lemmon || Mount Lemmon Survey || — || align=right | 2.2 km || 
|-id=060 bgcolor=#d6d6d6
| 384060 ||  || — || September 26, 2008 || Kitt Peak || Spacewatch || — || align=right | 1.9 km || 
|-id=061 bgcolor=#fefefe
| 384061 ||  || — || April 16, 2007 || Siding Spring || SSS || — || align=right | 1.3 km || 
|-id=062 bgcolor=#E9E9E9
| 384062 ||  || — || October 29, 2008 || Kitt Peak || Spacewatch || HEN || align=right | 1.0 km || 
|-id=063 bgcolor=#d6d6d6
| 384063 ||  || — || October 30, 2008 || Kitt Peak || Spacewatch || EMA || align=right | 4.3 km || 
|-id=064 bgcolor=#E9E9E9
| 384064 ||  || — || September 18, 2003 || Kitt Peak || Spacewatch || — || align=right | 2.1 km || 
|-id=065 bgcolor=#E9E9E9
| 384065 ||  || — || October 22, 2008 || Kitt Peak || Spacewatch || — || align=right | 2.8 km || 
|-id=066 bgcolor=#E9E9E9
| 384066 ||  || — || October 20, 2008 || Kitt Peak || Spacewatch || — || align=right | 3.6 km || 
|-id=067 bgcolor=#E9E9E9
| 384067 ||  || — || October 20, 2008 || Kitt Peak || Spacewatch || — || align=right | 1.7 km || 
|-id=068 bgcolor=#E9E9E9
| 384068 ||  || — || October 20, 2008 || Kitt Peak || Spacewatch || — || align=right | 2.5 km || 
|-id=069 bgcolor=#E9E9E9
| 384069 ||  || — || October 24, 2008 || Catalina || CSS || KON || align=right | 3.8 km || 
|-id=070 bgcolor=#E9E9E9
| 384070 ||  || — || October 20, 2008 || Mount Lemmon || Mount Lemmon Survey || — || align=right | 3.1 km || 
|-id=071 bgcolor=#E9E9E9
| 384071 ||  || — || October 23, 2008 || Kitt Peak || Spacewatch || — || align=right | 1.9 km || 
|-id=072 bgcolor=#E9E9E9
| 384072 ||  || — || September 24, 2008 || Catalina || CSS || MAR || align=right | 1.6 km || 
|-id=073 bgcolor=#E9E9E9
| 384073 ||  || — || October 28, 2008 || Socorro || LINEAR || — || align=right | 1.5 km || 
|-id=074 bgcolor=#E9E9E9
| 384074 ||  || — || November 7, 2008 || Andrushivka || Andrushivka Obs. || — || align=right | 2.0 km || 
|-id=075 bgcolor=#E9E9E9
| 384075 ||  || — || November 9, 2008 || Desert Moon || B. L. Stevens || AGN || align=right | 1.1 km || 
|-id=076 bgcolor=#E9E9E9
| 384076 ||  || — || November 1, 2008 || Kitt Peak || Spacewatch || — || align=right | 1.7 km || 
|-id=077 bgcolor=#E9E9E9
| 384077 ||  || — || October 25, 2008 || Kitt Peak || Spacewatch || — || align=right | 1.4 km || 
|-id=078 bgcolor=#d6d6d6
| 384078 ||  || — || November 2, 2008 || Kitt Peak || Spacewatch || BRA || align=right | 1.8 km || 
|-id=079 bgcolor=#E9E9E9
| 384079 ||  || — || November 3, 2008 || Kitt Peak || Spacewatch || — || align=right | 1.7 km || 
|-id=080 bgcolor=#E9E9E9
| 384080 ||  || — || October 8, 2008 || Mount Lemmon || Mount Lemmon Survey || — || align=right | 2.5 km || 
|-id=081 bgcolor=#E9E9E9
| 384081 ||  || — || November 4, 2008 || Catalina || CSS || — || align=right | 1.4 km || 
|-id=082 bgcolor=#E9E9E9
| 384082 ||  || — || November 4, 2008 || Catalina || CSS || — || align=right | 1.8 km || 
|-id=083 bgcolor=#E9E9E9
| 384083 ||  || — || October 23, 2008 || Kitt Peak || Spacewatch || — || align=right | 2.4 km || 
|-id=084 bgcolor=#E9E9E9
| 384084 ||  || — || November 6, 2008 || Mount Lemmon || Mount Lemmon Survey || — || align=right | 2.6 km || 
|-id=085 bgcolor=#E9E9E9
| 384085 ||  || — || November 8, 2008 || Mount Lemmon || Mount Lemmon Survey || HOF || align=right | 2.6 km || 
|-id=086 bgcolor=#E9E9E9
| 384086 ||  || — || November 8, 2008 || Kitt Peak || Spacewatch || JUN || align=right | 1.1 km || 
|-id=087 bgcolor=#E9E9E9
| 384087 ||  || — || November 7, 2008 || Mount Lemmon || Mount Lemmon Survey || AGN || align=right | 1.2 km || 
|-id=088 bgcolor=#d6d6d6
| 384088 ||  || — || November 4, 2008 || Kitt Peak || Spacewatch || — || align=right | 2.1 km || 
|-id=089 bgcolor=#E9E9E9
| 384089 ||  || — || November 6, 2008 || Catalina || CSS || — || align=right | 2.5 km || 
|-id=090 bgcolor=#E9E9E9
| 384090 ||  || — || November 1, 2008 || Mount Lemmon || Mount Lemmon Survey || — || align=right | 2.3 km || 
|-id=091 bgcolor=#E9E9E9
| 384091 ||  || — || November 1, 2008 || Mount Lemmon || Mount Lemmon Survey || — || align=right | 2.0 km || 
|-id=092 bgcolor=#d6d6d6
| 384092 ||  || — || November 2, 2008 || Mount Lemmon || Mount Lemmon Survey || CHA || align=right | 2.1 km || 
|-id=093 bgcolor=#E9E9E9
| 384093 ||  || — || November 7, 2008 || Mount Lemmon || Mount Lemmon Survey || — || align=right | 3.1 km || 
|-id=094 bgcolor=#E9E9E9
| 384094 ||  || — || November 17, 2008 || Kitt Peak || Spacewatch || HOF || align=right | 2.2 km || 
|-id=095 bgcolor=#E9E9E9
| 384095 ||  || — || November 17, 2008 || Kitt Peak || Spacewatch || HEN || align=right | 1.0 km || 
|-id=096 bgcolor=#E9E9E9
| 384096 ||  || — || November 19, 2008 || Mount Lemmon || Mount Lemmon Survey || — || align=right | 2.6 km || 
|-id=097 bgcolor=#d6d6d6
| 384097 ||  || — || October 1, 2008 || Kitt Peak || Spacewatch || — || align=right | 2.8 km || 
|-id=098 bgcolor=#E9E9E9
| 384098 ||  || — || November 17, 2008 || Kitt Peak || Spacewatch || — || align=right | 2.8 km || 
|-id=099 bgcolor=#E9E9E9
| 384099 ||  || — || November 17, 2008 || Kitt Peak || Spacewatch || — || align=right | 2.0 km || 
|-id=100 bgcolor=#E9E9E9
| 384100 ||  || — || November 17, 2008 || Kitt Peak || Spacewatch || — || align=right | 3.0 km || 
|}

384101–384200 

|-bgcolor=#d6d6d6
| 384101 ||  || — || November 17, 2008 || Kitt Peak || Spacewatch || KAR || align=right | 1.1 km || 
|-id=102 bgcolor=#d6d6d6
| 384102 ||  || — || November 17, 2008 || Kitt Peak || Spacewatch || — || align=right | 3.7 km || 
|-id=103 bgcolor=#E9E9E9
| 384103 ||  || — || November 18, 2008 || Catalina || CSS || — || align=right | 2.9 km || 
|-id=104 bgcolor=#d6d6d6
| 384104 ||  || — || November 18, 2008 || Kitt Peak || Spacewatch || — || align=right | 3.1 km || 
|-id=105 bgcolor=#E9E9E9
| 384105 ||  || — || November 7, 2008 || Mount Lemmon || Mount Lemmon Survey || — || align=right | 2.8 km || 
|-id=106 bgcolor=#E9E9E9
| 384106 ||  || — || November 20, 2008 || Kitt Peak || Spacewatch || MRX || align=right | 1.2 km || 
|-id=107 bgcolor=#d6d6d6
| 384107 ||  || — || November 22, 2008 || Kitt Peak || Spacewatch || — || align=right | 3.0 km || 
|-id=108 bgcolor=#d6d6d6
| 384108 ||  || — || November 23, 2008 || Mount Lemmon || Mount Lemmon Survey || — || align=right | 3.4 km || 
|-id=109 bgcolor=#E9E9E9
| 384109 ||  || — || November 26, 2008 || Črni Vrh || Črni Vrh || — || align=right | 2.3 km || 
|-id=110 bgcolor=#E9E9E9
| 384110 ||  || — || November 24, 2008 || Sierra Stars || W. G. Dillon, D. Wells || AST || align=right | 1.5 km || 
|-id=111 bgcolor=#E9E9E9
| 384111 ||  || — || November 23, 2008 || Socorro || LINEAR || — || align=right | 2.5 km || 
|-id=112 bgcolor=#E9E9E9
| 384112 ||  || — || November 19, 2008 || Catalina || CSS || CLO || align=right | 2.3 km || 
|-id=113 bgcolor=#d6d6d6
| 384113 ||  || — || November 30, 2008 || Mount Lemmon || Mount Lemmon Survey || — || align=right | 2.5 km || 
|-id=114 bgcolor=#d6d6d6
| 384114 ||  || — || November 20, 2008 || Mount Lemmon || Mount Lemmon Survey || LAU || align=right data-sort-value="0.85" | 850 m || 
|-id=115 bgcolor=#d6d6d6
| 384115 ||  || — || November 18, 2008 || Catalina || CSS || BRA || align=right | 2.3 km || 
|-id=116 bgcolor=#d6d6d6
| 384116 ||  || — || November 19, 2008 || Mount Lemmon || Mount Lemmon Survey || — || align=right | 3.3 km || 
|-id=117 bgcolor=#d6d6d6
| 384117 ||  || — || November 22, 2008 || Kitt Peak || Spacewatch || — || align=right | 3.4 km || 
|-id=118 bgcolor=#d6d6d6
| 384118 ||  || — || November 23, 2008 || Mount Lemmon || Mount Lemmon Survey || — || align=right | 3.8 km || 
|-id=119 bgcolor=#E9E9E9
| 384119 ||  || — || November 19, 2008 || Catalina || CSS || DOR || align=right | 2.9 km || 
|-id=120 bgcolor=#E9E9E9
| 384120 ||  || — || November 22, 2008 || Mount Lemmon || Mount Lemmon Survey || — || align=right | 2.5 km || 
|-id=121 bgcolor=#d6d6d6
| 384121 ||  || — || December 2, 2008 || Socorro || LINEAR || — || align=right | 3.9 km || 
|-id=122 bgcolor=#E9E9E9
| 384122 ||  || — || December 2, 2008 || Kitt Peak || Spacewatch || AGN || align=right data-sort-value="0.95" | 950 m || 
|-id=123 bgcolor=#d6d6d6
| 384123 ||  || — || November 24, 2008 || Kitt Peak || Spacewatch || CHA || align=right | 2.6 km || 
|-id=124 bgcolor=#d6d6d6
| 384124 ||  || — || December 1, 2008 || Kitt Peak || Spacewatch || — || align=right | 2.1 km || 
|-id=125 bgcolor=#d6d6d6
| 384125 ||  || — || December 7, 2008 || Mount Lemmon || Mount Lemmon Survey || — || align=right | 4.6 km || 
|-id=126 bgcolor=#d6d6d6
| 384126 ||  || — || December 21, 2008 || Kitt Peak || Spacewatch || — || align=right | 2.9 km || 
|-id=127 bgcolor=#d6d6d6
| 384127 ||  || — || December 29, 2008 || Mount Lemmon || Mount Lemmon Survey || HYG || align=right | 3.1 km || 
|-id=128 bgcolor=#E9E9E9
| 384128 ||  || — || December 30, 2008 || Kitt Peak || Spacewatch || — || align=right | 1.8 km || 
|-id=129 bgcolor=#d6d6d6
| 384129 ||  || — || December 31, 2008 || Kitt Peak || Spacewatch || — || align=right | 3.3 km || 
|-id=130 bgcolor=#d6d6d6
| 384130 ||  || — || December 29, 2008 || Mount Lemmon || Mount Lemmon Survey || HYG || align=right | 2.9 km || 
|-id=131 bgcolor=#d6d6d6
| 384131 ||  || — || December 30, 2008 || Mount Lemmon || Mount Lemmon Survey || — || align=right | 3.8 km || 
|-id=132 bgcolor=#d6d6d6
| 384132 ||  || — || December 31, 2008 || Kitt Peak || Spacewatch || 615 || align=right | 1.8 km || 
|-id=133 bgcolor=#d6d6d6
| 384133 ||  || — || December 29, 2008 || Kitt Peak || Spacewatch || CHA || align=right | 2.3 km || 
|-id=134 bgcolor=#d6d6d6
| 384134 ||  || — || December 29, 2008 || Kitt Peak || Spacewatch || — || align=right | 3.6 km || 
|-id=135 bgcolor=#E9E9E9
| 384135 ||  || — || December 29, 2008 || Kitt Peak || Spacewatch || — || align=right | 3.0 km || 
|-id=136 bgcolor=#d6d6d6
| 384136 ||  || — || December 29, 2008 || Mount Lemmon || Mount Lemmon Survey || — || align=right | 3.1 km || 
|-id=137 bgcolor=#d6d6d6
| 384137 ||  || — || December 29, 2008 || Kitt Peak || Spacewatch || — || align=right | 2.7 km || 
|-id=138 bgcolor=#d6d6d6
| 384138 ||  || — || December 29, 2008 || Kitt Peak || Spacewatch || — || align=right | 2.4 km || 
|-id=139 bgcolor=#d6d6d6
| 384139 ||  || — || December 29, 2008 || Kitt Peak || Spacewatch || — || align=right | 2.3 km || 
|-id=140 bgcolor=#d6d6d6
| 384140 ||  || — || December 29, 2008 || Mount Lemmon || Mount Lemmon Survey || THM || align=right | 2.2 km || 
|-id=141 bgcolor=#d6d6d6
| 384141 ||  || — || December 29, 2008 || Mount Lemmon || Mount Lemmon Survey || 615 || align=right | 1.6 km || 
|-id=142 bgcolor=#d6d6d6
| 384142 ||  || — || May 16, 2005 || Mount Lemmon || Mount Lemmon Survey || HYG || align=right | 2.6 km || 
|-id=143 bgcolor=#d6d6d6
| 384143 ||  || — || December 30, 2008 || Kitt Peak || Spacewatch || KOR || align=right | 1.5 km || 
|-id=144 bgcolor=#d6d6d6
| 384144 ||  || — || December 30, 2008 || Kitt Peak || Spacewatch || — || align=right | 3.8 km || 
|-id=145 bgcolor=#d6d6d6
| 384145 ||  || — || December 30, 2008 || Mount Lemmon || Mount Lemmon Survey || URS || align=right | 3.5 km || 
|-id=146 bgcolor=#d6d6d6
| 384146 ||  || — || December 22, 2008 || Mount Lemmon || Mount Lemmon Survey || EOS || align=right | 1.9 km || 
|-id=147 bgcolor=#d6d6d6
| 384147 ||  || — || December 22, 2008 || Kitt Peak || Spacewatch || KOR || align=right | 1.4 km || 
|-id=148 bgcolor=#d6d6d6
| 384148 ||  || — || December 21, 2008 || Kitt Peak || Spacewatch || — || align=right | 3.1 km || 
|-id=149 bgcolor=#d6d6d6
| 384149 ||  || — || December 30, 2008 || Catalina || CSS || — || align=right | 3.6 km || 
|-id=150 bgcolor=#d6d6d6
| 384150 ||  || — || December 22, 2008 || Catalina || CSS || — || align=right | 5.6 km || 
|-id=151 bgcolor=#d6d6d6
| 384151 ||  || — || January 2, 2009 || Mount Lemmon || Mount Lemmon Survey || EOS || align=right | 2.5 km || 
|-id=152 bgcolor=#d6d6d6
| 384152 ||  || — || December 22, 2008 || Kitt Peak || Spacewatch || — || align=right | 3.4 km || 
|-id=153 bgcolor=#d6d6d6
| 384153 ||  || — || January 2, 2009 || Mount Lemmon || Mount Lemmon Survey || — || align=right | 2.6 km || 
|-id=154 bgcolor=#d6d6d6
| 384154 ||  || — || January 2, 2009 || Mount Lemmon || Mount Lemmon Survey || VER || align=right | 4.2 km || 
|-id=155 bgcolor=#d6d6d6
| 384155 ||  || — || May 24, 2006 || Mount Lemmon || Mount Lemmon Survey || — || align=right | 3.4 km || 
|-id=156 bgcolor=#d6d6d6
| 384156 ||  || — || January 1, 2009 || Mount Lemmon || Mount Lemmon Survey || — || align=right | 2.6 km || 
|-id=157 bgcolor=#d6d6d6
| 384157 ||  || — || January 2, 2009 || Kitt Peak || Spacewatch || KOR || align=right | 1.4 km || 
|-id=158 bgcolor=#d6d6d6
| 384158 ||  || — || January 2, 2009 || Kitt Peak || Spacewatch || — || align=right | 2.2 km || 
|-id=159 bgcolor=#d6d6d6
| 384159 ||  || — || January 15, 2009 || Kitt Peak || Spacewatch || — || align=right | 4.4 km || 
|-id=160 bgcolor=#d6d6d6
| 384160 ||  || — || January 15, 2009 || Kitt Peak || Spacewatch || — || align=right | 3.2 km || 
|-id=161 bgcolor=#d6d6d6
| 384161 ||  || — || January 15, 2009 || Kitt Peak || Spacewatch || — || align=right | 3.5 km || 
|-id=162 bgcolor=#d6d6d6
| 384162 ||  || — || January 1, 2009 || Kitt Peak || Spacewatch || — || align=right | 4.3 km || 
|-id=163 bgcolor=#d6d6d6
| 384163 ||  || — || January 2, 2009 || Mount Lemmon || Mount Lemmon Survey || — || align=right | 2.7 km || 
|-id=164 bgcolor=#d6d6d6
| 384164 ||  || — || January 1, 2009 || Kitt Peak || Spacewatch || — || align=right | 3.4 km || 
|-id=165 bgcolor=#d6d6d6
| 384165 ||  || — || January 21, 2009 || Sandlot || G. Hug || — || align=right | 2.4 km || 
|-id=166 bgcolor=#d6d6d6
| 384166 ||  || — || January 2, 2009 || Mount Lemmon || Mount Lemmon Survey || — || align=right | 2.9 km || 
|-id=167 bgcolor=#d6d6d6
| 384167 ||  || — || January 19, 2009 || Mount Lemmon || Mount Lemmon Survey || — || align=right | 3.6 km || 
|-id=168 bgcolor=#d6d6d6
| 384168 ||  || — || January 16, 2009 || Kitt Peak || Spacewatch || — || align=right | 2.9 km || 
|-id=169 bgcolor=#d6d6d6
| 384169 ||  || — || January 16, 2009 || Kitt Peak || Spacewatch || KOR || align=right | 1.6 km || 
|-id=170 bgcolor=#d6d6d6
| 384170 ||  || — || January 16, 2009 || Kitt Peak || Spacewatch || EOS || align=right | 2.1 km || 
|-id=171 bgcolor=#d6d6d6
| 384171 ||  || — || January 16, 2009 || Kitt Peak || Spacewatch || — || align=right | 2.6 km || 
|-id=172 bgcolor=#d6d6d6
| 384172 ||  || — || January 1, 2009 || Mount Lemmon || Mount Lemmon Survey || — || align=right | 3.1 km || 
|-id=173 bgcolor=#d6d6d6
| 384173 ||  || — || January 16, 2009 || Kitt Peak || Spacewatch || — || align=right | 3.4 km || 
|-id=174 bgcolor=#d6d6d6
| 384174 ||  || — || January 16, 2009 || Kitt Peak || Spacewatch || — || align=right | 3.0 km || 
|-id=175 bgcolor=#d6d6d6
| 384175 ||  || — || January 16, 2009 || Kitt Peak || Spacewatch || URS || align=right | 4.4 km || 
|-id=176 bgcolor=#d6d6d6
| 384176 ||  || — || January 16, 2009 || Mount Lemmon || Mount Lemmon Survey || — || align=right | 3.0 km || 
|-id=177 bgcolor=#d6d6d6
| 384177 ||  || — || January 16, 2009 || Mount Lemmon || Mount Lemmon Survey || — || align=right | 2.2 km || 
|-id=178 bgcolor=#d6d6d6
| 384178 ||  || — || January 16, 2009 || Kitt Peak || Spacewatch || — || align=right | 4.0 km || 
|-id=179 bgcolor=#d6d6d6
| 384179 ||  || — || January 17, 2009 || Kitt Peak || Spacewatch || EOS || align=right | 2.1 km || 
|-id=180 bgcolor=#d6d6d6
| 384180 ||  || — || January 20, 2009 || Kitt Peak || Spacewatch || — || align=right | 3.6 km || 
|-id=181 bgcolor=#d6d6d6
| 384181 ||  || — || January 25, 2009 || Catalina || CSS || EOS || align=right | 2.6 km || 
|-id=182 bgcolor=#d6d6d6
| 384182 ||  || — || January 23, 2009 || Purple Mountain || PMO NEO || EOS || align=right | 2.0 km || 
|-id=183 bgcolor=#d6d6d6
| 384183 ||  || — || January 18, 2009 || Mount Lemmon || Mount Lemmon Survey || THB || align=right | 3.2 km || 
|-id=184 bgcolor=#d6d6d6
| 384184 ||  || — || January 20, 2009 || Catalina || CSS || TIR || align=right | 3.2 km || 
|-id=185 bgcolor=#d6d6d6
| 384185 ||  || — || January 25, 2009 || Kitt Peak || Spacewatch || — || align=right | 3.3 km || 
|-id=186 bgcolor=#d6d6d6
| 384186 ||  || — || January 25, 2009 || Kitt Peak || Spacewatch || — || align=right | 3.6 km || 
|-id=187 bgcolor=#d6d6d6
| 384187 ||  || — || January 25, 2009 || Kitt Peak || Spacewatch || — || align=right | 2.0 km || 
|-id=188 bgcolor=#d6d6d6
| 384188 ||  || — || January 29, 2009 || Mount Lemmon || Mount Lemmon Survey || — || align=right | 3.2 km || 
|-id=189 bgcolor=#d6d6d6
| 384189 ||  || — || December 29, 2008 || Mount Lemmon || Mount Lemmon Survey || — || align=right | 3.2 km || 
|-id=190 bgcolor=#d6d6d6
| 384190 ||  || — || January 28, 2009 || Catalina || CSS || — || align=right | 2.8 km || 
|-id=191 bgcolor=#fefefe
| 384191 ||  || — || January 28, 2009 || Catalina || CSS || H || align=right data-sort-value="0.66" | 660 m || 
|-id=192 bgcolor=#d6d6d6
| 384192 ||  || — || January 26, 2009 || Cerro Burek || Alianza S4 Obs. || — || align=right | 3.2 km || 
|-id=193 bgcolor=#d6d6d6
| 384193 ||  || — || January 29, 2009 || Mount Lemmon || Mount Lemmon Survey || — || align=right | 3.8 km || 
|-id=194 bgcolor=#d6d6d6
| 384194 ||  || — || January 30, 2009 || Mount Lemmon || Mount Lemmon Survey || — || align=right | 3.8 km || 
|-id=195 bgcolor=#d6d6d6
| 384195 ||  || — || January 31, 2009 || Mount Lemmon || Mount Lemmon Survey || HYG || align=right | 2.3 km || 
|-id=196 bgcolor=#d6d6d6
| 384196 ||  || — || January 31, 2009 || Siding Spring || SSS || — || align=right | 4.1 km || 
|-id=197 bgcolor=#d6d6d6
| 384197 ||  || — || January 29, 2009 || Kitt Peak || Spacewatch || — || align=right | 2.6 km || 
|-id=198 bgcolor=#d6d6d6
| 384198 ||  || — || January 30, 2009 || Mount Lemmon || Mount Lemmon Survey || — || align=right | 2.3 km || 
|-id=199 bgcolor=#d6d6d6
| 384199 ||  || — || January 31, 2009 || Kitt Peak || Spacewatch || — || align=right | 2.7 km || 
|-id=200 bgcolor=#d6d6d6
| 384200 ||  || — || January 31, 2009 || Kitt Peak || Spacewatch || — || align=right | 2.7 km || 
|}

384201–384300 

|-bgcolor=#d6d6d6
| 384201 ||  || — || January 31, 2009 || Kitt Peak || Spacewatch || — || align=right | 2.6 km || 
|-id=202 bgcolor=#d6d6d6
| 384202 ||  || — || January 31, 2009 || Kitt Peak || Spacewatch || EOS || align=right | 2.0 km || 
|-id=203 bgcolor=#d6d6d6
| 384203 ||  || — || January 18, 2009 || Kitt Peak || Spacewatch || — || align=right | 3.3 km || 
|-id=204 bgcolor=#d6d6d6
| 384204 ||  || — || January 18, 2009 || Mount Lemmon || Mount Lemmon Survey || — || align=right | 3.6 km || 
|-id=205 bgcolor=#d6d6d6
| 384205 ||  || — || January 25, 2009 || Kitt Peak || Spacewatch || — || align=right | 2.2 km || 
|-id=206 bgcolor=#d6d6d6
| 384206 ||  || — || January 29, 2009 || Catalina || CSS || — || align=right | 5.2 km || 
|-id=207 bgcolor=#d6d6d6
| 384207 ||  || — || January 25, 2009 || Kitt Peak || Spacewatch || THM || align=right | 2.0 km || 
|-id=208 bgcolor=#d6d6d6
| 384208 ||  || — || January 25, 2009 || Kitt Peak || Spacewatch || — || align=right | 2.4 km || 
|-id=209 bgcolor=#d6d6d6
| 384209 ||  || — || January 18, 2009 || Mount Lemmon || Mount Lemmon Survey || — || align=right | 5.1 km || 
|-id=210 bgcolor=#d6d6d6
| 384210 ||  || — || January 19, 2009 || Mount Lemmon || Mount Lemmon Survey || EOS || align=right | 2.1 km || 
|-id=211 bgcolor=#d6d6d6
| 384211 ||  || — || February 1, 2009 || Kitt Peak || Spacewatch || — || align=right | 2.5 km || 
|-id=212 bgcolor=#d6d6d6
| 384212 ||  || — || February 1, 2009 || Kitt Peak || Spacewatch || — || align=right | 3.3 km || 
|-id=213 bgcolor=#d6d6d6
| 384213 ||  || — || February 1, 2009 || Kitt Peak || Spacewatch || HYG || align=right | 2.0 km || 
|-id=214 bgcolor=#d6d6d6
| 384214 ||  || — || February 1, 2009 || Kitt Peak || Spacewatch || THM || align=right | 2.3 km || 
|-id=215 bgcolor=#d6d6d6
| 384215 ||  || — || February 13, 2009 || Kitt Peak || Spacewatch || — || align=right | 3.6 km || 
|-id=216 bgcolor=#d6d6d6
| 384216 ||  || — || February 14, 2009 || Mount Lemmon || Mount Lemmon Survey || — || align=right | 3.8 km || 
|-id=217 bgcolor=#d6d6d6
| 384217 ||  || — || February 4, 2009 || Mount Lemmon || Mount Lemmon Survey || — || align=right | 2.9 km || 
|-id=218 bgcolor=#d6d6d6
| 384218 ||  || — || February 14, 2009 || Kitt Peak || Spacewatch || — || align=right | 3.8 km || 
|-id=219 bgcolor=#d6d6d6
| 384219 ||  || — || November 11, 2002 || Kitt Peak || Spacewatch || — || align=right | 4.5 km || 
|-id=220 bgcolor=#fefefe
| 384220 ||  || — || February 21, 2009 || Catalina || CSS || H || align=right data-sort-value="0.71" | 710 m || 
|-id=221 bgcolor=#d6d6d6
| 384221 ||  || — || February 17, 2009 || Socorro || LINEAR || — || align=right | 3.7 km || 
|-id=222 bgcolor=#d6d6d6
| 384222 ||  || — || February 1, 2009 || Mount Lemmon || Mount Lemmon Survey || — || align=right | 3.0 km || 
|-id=223 bgcolor=#d6d6d6
| 384223 ||  || — || February 17, 2009 || Kitt Peak || Spacewatch || EOS || align=right | 5.1 km || 
|-id=224 bgcolor=#d6d6d6
| 384224 ||  || — || February 19, 2009 || Kitt Peak || Spacewatch || EOS || align=right | 1.6 km || 
|-id=225 bgcolor=#d6d6d6
| 384225 ||  || — || February 22, 2009 || Calar Alto || F. Hormuth || — || align=right | 2.0 km || 
|-id=226 bgcolor=#d6d6d6
| 384226 ||  || — || February 23, 2009 || Cordell-Lorenz || D. T. Durig || — || align=right | 2.5 km || 
|-id=227 bgcolor=#d6d6d6
| 384227 ||  || — || February 20, 2009 || Kitt Peak || Spacewatch || TIR || align=right | 2.8 km || 
|-id=228 bgcolor=#d6d6d6
| 384228 ||  || — || February 20, 2009 || Kitt Peak || Spacewatch || — || align=right | 2.1 km || 
|-id=229 bgcolor=#d6d6d6
| 384229 ||  || — || January 17, 2009 || Kitt Peak || Spacewatch || — || align=right | 2.7 km || 
|-id=230 bgcolor=#d6d6d6
| 384230 ||  || — || February 28, 2009 || Socorro || LINEAR || — || align=right | 3.0 km || 
|-id=231 bgcolor=#d6d6d6
| 384231 ||  || — || September 16, 2006 || Anderson Mesa || LONEOS || VER || align=right | 3.4 km || 
|-id=232 bgcolor=#d6d6d6
| 384232 ||  || — || January 17, 2009 || Kitt Peak || Spacewatch || EOS || align=right | 1.9 km || 
|-id=233 bgcolor=#d6d6d6
| 384233 ||  || — || February 22, 2009 || Kitt Peak || Spacewatch || — || align=right | 2.9 km || 
|-id=234 bgcolor=#d6d6d6
| 384234 ||  || — || February 22, 2009 || Kitt Peak || Spacewatch || — || align=right | 2.2 km || 
|-id=235 bgcolor=#d6d6d6
| 384235 ||  || — || December 30, 2008 || Mount Lemmon || Mount Lemmon Survey || — || align=right | 3.7 km || 
|-id=236 bgcolor=#d6d6d6
| 384236 ||  || — || November 19, 2007 || Kitt Peak || Spacewatch || — || align=right | 2.7 km || 
|-id=237 bgcolor=#d6d6d6
| 384237 ||  || — || February 20, 2009 || Socorro || LINEAR || — || align=right | 3.5 km || 
|-id=238 bgcolor=#d6d6d6
| 384238 ||  || — || February 24, 2009 || Mount Lemmon || Mount Lemmon Survey || — || align=right | 2.7 km || 
|-id=239 bgcolor=#d6d6d6
| 384239 ||  || — || February 19, 2009 || La Sagra || OAM Obs. || HYG || align=right | 2.8 km || 
|-id=240 bgcolor=#d6d6d6
| 384240 ||  || — || February 26, 2009 || Catalina || CSS || — || align=right | 2.4 km || 
|-id=241 bgcolor=#d6d6d6
| 384241 ||  || — || February 21, 2009 || Mount Lemmon || Mount Lemmon Survey || — || align=right | 2.2 km || 
|-id=242 bgcolor=#d6d6d6
| 384242 ||  || — || February 22, 2009 || Mount Lemmon || Mount Lemmon Survey || — || align=right | 4.0 km || 
|-id=243 bgcolor=#d6d6d6
| 384243 ||  || — || February 28, 2009 || Mount Lemmon || Mount Lemmon Survey || — || align=right | 2.8 km || 
|-id=244 bgcolor=#d6d6d6
| 384244 ||  || — || February 28, 2009 || Kitt Peak || Spacewatch || — || align=right | 2.7 km || 
|-id=245 bgcolor=#d6d6d6
| 384245 ||  || — || February 27, 2009 || Kitt Peak || Spacewatch || — || align=right | 3.5 km || 
|-id=246 bgcolor=#d6d6d6
| 384246 ||  || — || February 24, 2009 || Mount Lemmon || Mount Lemmon Survey || — || align=right | 3.3 km || 
|-id=247 bgcolor=#fefefe
| 384247 ||  || — || February 16, 2009 || Kitt Peak || Spacewatch || H || align=right data-sort-value="0.61" | 610 m || 
|-id=248 bgcolor=#d6d6d6
| 384248 ||  || — || February 22, 2009 || Kitt Peak || Spacewatch || 637 || align=right | 2.5 km || 
|-id=249 bgcolor=#d6d6d6
| 384249 ||  || — || February 19, 2009 || Mount Lemmon || Mount Lemmon Survey || HYG || align=right | 2.1 km || 
|-id=250 bgcolor=#d6d6d6
| 384250 ||  || — || February 24, 2009 || Kitt Peak || Spacewatch || HYG || align=right | 2.5 km || 
|-id=251 bgcolor=#d6d6d6
| 384251 ||  || — || January 18, 2009 || Mount Lemmon || Mount Lemmon Survey || — || align=right | 2.5 km || 
|-id=252 bgcolor=#d6d6d6
| 384252 ||  || — || March 14, 2009 || La Sagra || OAM Obs. || — || align=right | 3.7 km || 
|-id=253 bgcolor=#d6d6d6
| 384253 ||  || — || March 15, 2009 || Kitt Peak || Spacewatch || HYG || align=right | 2.9 km || 
|-id=254 bgcolor=#d6d6d6
| 384254 ||  || — || March 15, 2009 || Kitt Peak || Spacewatch || THM || align=right | 2.2 km || 
|-id=255 bgcolor=#d6d6d6
| 384255 ||  || — || March 15, 2009 || Kitt Peak || Spacewatch || — || align=right | 2.3 km || 
|-id=256 bgcolor=#d6d6d6
| 384256 ||  || — || March 15, 2009 || Kitt Peak || Spacewatch || HYG || align=right | 3.0 km || 
|-id=257 bgcolor=#d6d6d6
| 384257 ||  || — || March 15, 2009 || Mount Lemmon || Mount Lemmon Survey || THM || align=right | 2.3 km || 
|-id=258 bgcolor=#d6d6d6
| 384258 ||  || — || March 15, 2009 || La Sagra || OAM Obs. || EUP || align=right | 3.7 km || 
|-id=259 bgcolor=#d6d6d6
| 384259 ||  || — || March 1, 2009 || Mount Lemmon || Mount Lemmon Survey || — || align=right | 5.6 km || 
|-id=260 bgcolor=#d6d6d6
| 384260 ||  || — || March 6, 2009 || Siding Spring || SSS || MEL || align=right | 4.9 km || 
|-id=261 bgcolor=#d6d6d6
| 384261 ||  || — || March 16, 2009 || La Sagra || OAM Obs. || TIR || align=right | 2.9 km || 
|-id=262 bgcolor=#d6d6d6
| 384262 ||  || — || March 22, 2009 || Taunus || R. Kling, U. Zimmer || — || align=right | 3.4 km || 
|-id=263 bgcolor=#d6d6d6
| 384263 ||  || — || March 16, 2009 || Catalina || CSS || — || align=right | 3.7 km || 
|-id=264 bgcolor=#d6d6d6
| 384264 ||  || — || March 17, 2009 || Catalina || CSS || Tj (2.99) || align=right | 4.4 km || 
|-id=265 bgcolor=#d6d6d6
| 384265 ||  || — || March 21, 2009 || Catalina || CSS || — || align=right | 5.2 km || 
|-id=266 bgcolor=#d6d6d6
| 384266 ||  || — || March 30, 2009 || Sierra Stars || F. Tozzi || — || align=right | 4.1 km || 
|-id=267 bgcolor=#fefefe
| 384267 ||  || — || March 28, 2009 || Catalina || CSS || H || align=right | 1.0 km || 
|-id=268 bgcolor=#d6d6d6
| 384268 ||  || — || March 28, 2009 || Catalina || CSS || EUP || align=right | 5.5 km || 
|-id=269 bgcolor=#fefefe
| 384269 ||  || — || March 18, 2009 || Socorro || LINEAR || H || align=right data-sort-value="0.65" | 650 m || 
|-id=270 bgcolor=#d6d6d6
| 384270 ||  || — || April 17, 2009 || Kitt Peak || Spacewatch || EOS || align=right | 2.0 km || 
|-id=271 bgcolor=#fefefe
| 384271 ||  || — || September 10, 2007 || Catalina || CSS || H || align=right data-sort-value="0.60" | 600 m || 
|-id=272 bgcolor=#fefefe
| 384272 ||  || — || December 16, 2004 || Catalina || CSS || — || align=right | 1.1 km || 
|-id=273 bgcolor=#FA8072
| 384273 ||  || — || May 24, 2009 || Catalina || CSS || — || align=right data-sort-value="0.82" | 820 m || 
|-id=274 bgcolor=#fefefe
| 384274 ||  || — || August 15, 2009 || Calvin-Rehoboth || L. A. Molnar || FLO || align=right data-sort-value="0.63" | 630 m || 
|-id=275 bgcolor=#fefefe
| 384275 ||  || — || August 12, 2009 || La Sagra || OAM Obs. || — || align=right data-sort-value="0.60" | 600 m || 
|-id=276 bgcolor=#fefefe
| 384276 ||  || — || August 15, 2009 || Kitt Peak || Spacewatch || NYS || align=right data-sort-value="0.61" | 610 m || 
|-id=277 bgcolor=#fefefe
| 384277 ||  || — || August 17, 2009 || Altschwendt || W. Ries || — || align=right data-sort-value="0.70" | 700 m || 
|-id=278 bgcolor=#fefefe
| 384278 ||  || — || August 17, 2009 || Socorro || LINEAR || — || align=right data-sort-value="0.97" | 970 m || 
|-id=279 bgcolor=#fefefe
| 384279 ||  || — || August 15, 2009 || Catalina || CSS || FLO || align=right data-sort-value="0.81" | 810 m || 
|-id=280 bgcolor=#fefefe
| 384280 ||  || — || August 17, 2009 || Kitt Peak || Spacewatch || V || align=right data-sort-value="0.67" | 670 m || 
|-id=281 bgcolor=#fefefe
| 384281 ||  || — || August 19, 2009 || La Sagra || OAM Obs. || NYS || align=right data-sort-value="0.65" | 650 m || 
|-id=282 bgcolor=#fefefe
| 384282 Evgeniyegorov ||  ||  || August 28, 2009 || Zelenchukskaya || T. V. Kryachko || EUT || align=right data-sort-value="0.86" | 860 m || 
|-id=283 bgcolor=#fefefe
| 384283 ||  || — || August 20, 2009 || Kitt Peak || Spacewatch || FLO || align=right data-sort-value="0.87" | 870 m || 
|-id=284 bgcolor=#fefefe
| 384284 ||  || — || August 26, 2009 || Catalina || CSS || NYS || align=right data-sort-value="0.63" | 630 m || 
|-id=285 bgcolor=#fefefe
| 384285 ||  || — || February 28, 2008 || Mount Lemmon || Mount Lemmon Survey || FLO || align=right data-sort-value="0.71" | 710 m || 
|-id=286 bgcolor=#fefefe
| 384286 ||  || — || August 27, 2009 || Kitt Peak || Spacewatch || MAS || align=right data-sort-value="0.66" | 660 m || 
|-id=287 bgcolor=#fefefe
| 384287 ||  || — || September 10, 2009 || Catalina || CSS || — || align=right | 1.00 km || 
|-id=288 bgcolor=#fefefe
| 384288 ||  || — || September 12, 2009 || Kitt Peak || Spacewatch || — || align=right data-sort-value="0.86" | 860 m || 
|-id=289 bgcolor=#fefefe
| 384289 ||  || — || September 12, 2009 || Kitt Peak || Spacewatch || — || align=right data-sort-value="0.76" | 760 m || 
|-id=290 bgcolor=#fefefe
| 384290 ||  || — || September 12, 2009 || Kitt Peak || Spacewatch || — || align=right data-sort-value="0.96" | 960 m || 
|-id=291 bgcolor=#fefefe
| 384291 ||  || — || September 12, 2009 || Kitt Peak || Spacewatch || — || align=right data-sort-value="0.78" | 780 m || 
|-id=292 bgcolor=#fefefe
| 384292 ||  || — || September 12, 2009 || Kitt Peak || Spacewatch || V || align=right data-sort-value="0.68" | 680 m || 
|-id=293 bgcolor=#fefefe
| 384293 ||  || — || September 15, 2009 || Kitt Peak || Spacewatch || V || align=right data-sort-value="0.83" | 830 m || 
|-id=294 bgcolor=#fefefe
| 384294 ||  || — || September 13, 2009 || Socorro || LINEAR || FLO || align=right data-sort-value="0.70" | 700 m || 
|-id=295 bgcolor=#fefefe
| 384295 ||  || — || September 12, 2009 || Kitt Peak || Spacewatch || — || align=right | 1.4 km || 
|-id=296 bgcolor=#fefefe
| 384296 ||  || — || September 15, 2009 || Kitt Peak || Spacewatch || FLO || align=right data-sort-value="0.63" | 630 m || 
|-id=297 bgcolor=#fefefe
| 384297 ||  || — || September 15, 2009 || Kitt Peak || Spacewatch || NYS || align=right data-sort-value="0.70" | 700 m || 
|-id=298 bgcolor=#fefefe
| 384298 ||  || — || September 15, 2009 || Kitt Peak || Spacewatch || V || align=right data-sort-value="0.58" | 580 m || 
|-id=299 bgcolor=#fefefe
| 384299 ||  || — || September 15, 2009 || Kitt Peak || Spacewatch || — || align=right data-sort-value="0.84" | 840 m || 
|-id=300 bgcolor=#fefefe
| 384300 ||  || — || September 16, 2009 || Kitt Peak || Spacewatch || — || align=right data-sort-value="0.98" | 980 m || 
|}

384301–384400 

|-bgcolor=#fefefe
| 384301 ||  || — || September 20, 2009 || Calvin-Rehoboth || Calvin–Rehoboth Obs. || — || align=right data-sort-value="0.88" | 880 m || 
|-id=302 bgcolor=#fefefe
| 384302 ||  || — || November 24, 2006 || Kitt Peak || Spacewatch || — || align=right data-sort-value="0.60" | 600 m || 
|-id=303 bgcolor=#fefefe
| 384303 ||  || — || September 16, 2009 || Kitt Peak || Spacewatch || NYS || align=right data-sort-value="0.67" | 670 m || 
|-id=304 bgcolor=#fefefe
| 384304 ||  || — || September 16, 2009 || Kitt Peak || Spacewatch || MAS || align=right data-sort-value="0.65" | 650 m || 
|-id=305 bgcolor=#fefefe
| 384305 ||  || — || September 17, 2009 || Kitt Peak || Spacewatch || — || align=right data-sort-value="0.83" | 830 m || 
|-id=306 bgcolor=#fefefe
| 384306 ||  || — || September 17, 2009 || Kitt Peak || Spacewatch || — || align=right data-sort-value="0.89" | 890 m || 
|-id=307 bgcolor=#fefefe
| 384307 ||  || — || September 18, 2009 || Kitt Peak || Spacewatch || NYS || align=right data-sort-value="0.84" | 840 m || 
|-id=308 bgcolor=#fefefe
| 384308 ||  || — || September 16, 2009 || Mount Lemmon || Mount Lemmon Survey || — || align=right data-sort-value="0.66" | 660 m || 
|-id=309 bgcolor=#fefefe
| 384309 ||  || — || September 18, 2009 || Kitt Peak || Spacewatch || — || align=right data-sort-value="0.81" | 810 m || 
|-id=310 bgcolor=#fefefe
| 384310 ||  || — || September 18, 2009 || Kitt Peak || Spacewatch || V || align=right data-sort-value="0.65" | 650 m || 
|-id=311 bgcolor=#fefefe
| 384311 ||  || — || September 18, 2009 || Kitt Peak || Spacewatch || FLO || align=right data-sort-value="0.60" | 600 m || 
|-id=312 bgcolor=#fefefe
| 384312 ||  || — || September 18, 2009 || Kitt Peak || Spacewatch || MAS || align=right data-sort-value="0.71" | 710 m || 
|-id=313 bgcolor=#fefefe
| 384313 ||  || — || September 19, 2009 || Kitt Peak || Spacewatch || NYS || align=right data-sort-value="0.58" | 580 m || 
|-id=314 bgcolor=#fefefe
| 384314 ||  || — || September 20, 2009 || Mount Lemmon || Mount Lemmon Survey || ERI || align=right | 1.3 km || 
|-id=315 bgcolor=#fefefe
| 384315 ||  || — || September 20, 2009 || Kitt Peak || Spacewatch || V || align=right data-sort-value="0.76" | 760 m || 
|-id=316 bgcolor=#fefefe
| 384316 ||  || — || September 23, 2009 || Mount Lemmon || Mount Lemmon Survey || MAS || align=right data-sort-value="0.77" | 770 m || 
|-id=317 bgcolor=#fefefe
| 384317 ||  || — || September 22, 2009 || Kitt Peak || Spacewatch || NYS || align=right data-sort-value="0.59" | 590 m || 
|-id=318 bgcolor=#fefefe
| 384318 ||  || — || September 23, 2009 || Kitt Peak || Spacewatch || MAS || align=right data-sort-value="0.82" | 820 m || 
|-id=319 bgcolor=#fefefe
| 384319 ||  || — || September 23, 2009 || Kitt Peak || Spacewatch || FLO || align=right data-sort-value="0.68" | 680 m || 
|-id=320 bgcolor=#fefefe
| 384320 ||  || — || September 23, 2009 || Kitt Peak || Spacewatch || — || align=right data-sort-value="0.71" | 710 m || 
|-id=321 bgcolor=#fefefe
| 384321 ||  || — || November 27, 2006 || Kitt Peak || Spacewatch || — || align=right data-sort-value="0.56" | 560 m || 
|-id=322 bgcolor=#fefefe
| 384322 ||  || — || September 25, 2009 || Kitt Peak || Spacewatch || NYS || align=right data-sort-value="0.46" | 460 m || 
|-id=323 bgcolor=#fefefe
| 384323 ||  || — || September 17, 2009 || Catalina || CSS || — || align=right data-sort-value="0.89" | 890 m || 
|-id=324 bgcolor=#fefefe
| 384324 ||  || — || January 10, 2003 || Kitt Peak || Spacewatch || NYS || align=right data-sort-value="0.60" | 600 m || 
|-id=325 bgcolor=#fefefe
| 384325 ||  || — || September 24, 2009 || Kitt Peak || Spacewatch || V || align=right data-sort-value="0.79" | 790 m || 
|-id=326 bgcolor=#fefefe
| 384326 ||  || — || September 24, 2009 || Kitt Peak || Spacewatch || — || align=right data-sort-value="0.75" | 750 m || 
|-id=327 bgcolor=#fefefe
| 384327 ||  || — || September 25, 2009 || Kitt Peak || Spacewatch || — || align=right | 1.7 km || 
|-id=328 bgcolor=#fefefe
| 384328 ||  || — || September 16, 2009 || Catalina || CSS || FLO || align=right data-sort-value="0.73" | 730 m || 
|-id=329 bgcolor=#fefefe
| 384329 ||  || — || August 27, 2009 || Kitt Peak || Spacewatch || — || align=right data-sort-value="0.66" | 660 m || 
|-id=330 bgcolor=#fefefe
| 384330 ||  || — || November 11, 1998 || Caussols || ODAS || NYS || align=right data-sort-value="0.94" | 940 m || 
|-id=331 bgcolor=#fefefe
| 384331 ||  || — || September 20, 2009 || Mount Lemmon || Mount Lemmon Survey || — || align=right data-sort-value="0.85" | 850 m || 
|-id=332 bgcolor=#fefefe
| 384332 ||  || — || September 27, 2009 || Catalina || CSS || — || align=right data-sort-value="0.89" | 890 m || 
|-id=333 bgcolor=#fefefe
| 384333 ||  || — || September 17, 2009 || Kitt Peak || Spacewatch || FLO || align=right data-sort-value="0.73" | 730 m || 
|-id=334 bgcolor=#fefefe
| 384334 ||  || — || September 27, 2009 || Catalina || CSS || — || align=right | 1.2 km || 
|-id=335 bgcolor=#fefefe
| 384335 ||  || — || September 26, 2009 || Kitt Peak || Spacewatch || FLO || align=right data-sort-value="0.56" | 560 m || 
|-id=336 bgcolor=#fefefe
| 384336 ||  || — || September 25, 2009 || Kitt Peak || Spacewatch || FLO || align=right data-sort-value="0.61" | 610 m || 
|-id=337 bgcolor=#fefefe
| 384337 ||  || — || October 10, 2009 || Bisei SG Center || BATTeRS || — || align=right data-sort-value="0.94" | 940 m || 
|-id=338 bgcolor=#fefefe
| 384338 ||  || — || October 11, 2009 || La Sagra || OAM Obs. || NYS || align=right data-sort-value="0.70" | 700 m || 
|-id=339 bgcolor=#fefefe
| 384339 ||  || — || October 11, 2009 || La Sagra || OAM Obs. || ERI || align=right | 1.5 km || 
|-id=340 bgcolor=#fefefe
| 384340 ||  || — || October 13, 2009 || Mayhill || A. Lowe || V || align=right data-sort-value="0.73" | 730 m || 
|-id=341 bgcolor=#fefefe
| 384341 ||  || — || October 12, 2009 || La Sagra || OAM Obs. || — || align=right | 1.5 km || 
|-id=342 bgcolor=#fefefe
| 384342 ||  || — || October 11, 2009 || Mount Lemmon || Mount Lemmon Survey || NYS || align=right data-sort-value="0.76" | 760 m || 
|-id=343 bgcolor=#fefefe
| 384343 ||  || — || October 10, 2009 || Dauban || F. Kugel || ERI || align=right | 1.7 km || 
|-id=344 bgcolor=#fefefe
| 384344 ||  || — || October 12, 2009 || Mount Lemmon || Mount Lemmon Survey || — || align=right data-sort-value="0.89" | 890 m || 
|-id=345 bgcolor=#fefefe
| 384345 ||  || — || September 28, 2009 || Mount Lemmon || Mount Lemmon Survey || ERI || align=right | 1.6 km || 
|-id=346 bgcolor=#fefefe
| 384346 ||  || — || October 14, 2009 || La Sagra || OAM Obs. || — || align=right data-sort-value="0.94" | 940 m || 
|-id=347 bgcolor=#fefefe
| 384347 ||  || — || October 15, 2009 || Mount Lemmon || Mount Lemmon Survey || FLO || align=right data-sort-value="0.91" | 910 m || 
|-id=348 bgcolor=#fefefe
| 384348 ||  || — || October 14, 2009 || Catalina || CSS || — || align=right | 1.0 km || 
|-id=349 bgcolor=#fefefe
| 384349 ||  || — || October 14, 2009 || Mount Lemmon || Mount Lemmon Survey || NYS || align=right data-sort-value="0.75" | 750 m || 
|-id=350 bgcolor=#fefefe
| 384350 ||  || — || October 16, 2009 || Socorro || LINEAR || — || align=right data-sort-value="0.73" | 730 m || 
|-id=351 bgcolor=#fefefe
| 384351 ||  || — || October 1, 2009 || Mount Lemmon || Mount Lemmon Survey || — || align=right | 1.7 km || 
|-id=352 bgcolor=#fefefe
| 384352 ||  || — || October 18, 2009 || La Sagra || OAM Obs. || NYS || align=right data-sort-value="0.63" | 630 m || 
|-id=353 bgcolor=#fefefe
| 384353 ||  || — || October 20, 2009 || Mayhill || iTelescope Obs. || — || align=right data-sort-value="0.94" | 940 m || 
|-id=354 bgcolor=#fefefe
| 384354 ||  || — || October 22, 2009 || Catalina || CSS || NYS || align=right data-sort-value="0.75" | 750 m || 
|-id=355 bgcolor=#fefefe
| 384355 ||  || — || October 18, 2009 || Mount Lemmon || Mount Lemmon Survey || NYS || align=right data-sort-value="0.59" | 590 m || 
|-id=356 bgcolor=#fefefe
| 384356 ||  || — || October 22, 2009 || Catalina || CSS || — || align=right | 1.1 km || 
|-id=357 bgcolor=#fefefe
| 384357 ||  || — || October 23, 2009 || Kitt Peak || Spacewatch || — || align=right data-sort-value="0.75" | 750 m || 
|-id=358 bgcolor=#fefefe
| 384358 ||  || — || October 23, 2009 || Mount Lemmon || Mount Lemmon Survey || — || align=right data-sort-value="0.91" | 910 m || 
|-id=359 bgcolor=#fefefe
| 384359 ||  || — || October 21, 2009 || Mount Lemmon || Mount Lemmon Survey || NYS || align=right data-sort-value="0.60" | 600 m || 
|-id=360 bgcolor=#fefefe
| 384360 ||  || — || October 22, 2009 || Catalina || CSS || NYS || align=right data-sort-value="0.70" | 700 m || 
|-id=361 bgcolor=#fefefe
| 384361 ||  || — || February 21, 2007 || Mount Lemmon || Mount Lemmon Survey || NYS || align=right data-sort-value="0.52" | 520 m || 
|-id=362 bgcolor=#fefefe
| 384362 ||  || — || September 19, 2009 || Mount Lemmon || Mount Lemmon Survey || V || align=right data-sort-value="0.53" | 530 m || 
|-id=363 bgcolor=#fefefe
| 384363 ||  || — || October 23, 2009 || Mount Lemmon || Mount Lemmon Survey || MAS || align=right data-sort-value="0.80" | 800 m || 
|-id=364 bgcolor=#fefefe
| 384364 ||  || — || October 26, 2009 || Bisei SG Center || BATTeRS || — || align=right | 1.7 km || 
|-id=365 bgcolor=#fefefe
| 384365 ||  || — || October 24, 2009 || Catalina || CSS || — || align=right data-sort-value="0.99" | 990 m || 
|-id=366 bgcolor=#fefefe
| 384366 ||  || — || October 23, 2009 || Kitt Peak || Spacewatch || NYS || align=right data-sort-value="0.58" | 580 m || 
|-id=367 bgcolor=#fefefe
| 384367 ||  || — || October 23, 2009 || Kitt Peak || Spacewatch || MAS || align=right data-sort-value="0.71" | 710 m || 
|-id=368 bgcolor=#fefefe
| 384368 ||  || — || October 22, 2009 || Mount Lemmon || Mount Lemmon Survey || — || align=right data-sort-value="0.89" | 890 m || 
|-id=369 bgcolor=#fefefe
| 384369 ||  || — || December 23, 2006 || Mount Lemmon || Mount Lemmon Survey || — || align=right data-sort-value="0.93" | 930 m || 
|-id=370 bgcolor=#fefefe
| 384370 ||  || — || October 16, 2009 || Catalina || CSS || — || align=right data-sort-value="0.91" | 910 m || 
|-id=371 bgcolor=#fefefe
| 384371 ||  || — || October 24, 2009 || Catalina || CSS || NYS || align=right data-sort-value="0.54" | 540 m || 
|-id=372 bgcolor=#E9E9E9
| 384372 ||  || — || October 25, 2009 || Mount Lemmon || Mount Lemmon Survey || — || align=right | 1.2 km || 
|-id=373 bgcolor=#fefefe
| 384373 ||  || — || October 18, 2009 || Mount Lemmon || Mount Lemmon Survey || — || align=right data-sort-value="0.75" | 750 m || 
|-id=374 bgcolor=#fefefe
| 384374 ||  || — || October 23, 2009 || Mount Lemmon || Mount Lemmon Survey || — || align=right data-sort-value="0.80" | 800 m || 
|-id=375 bgcolor=#fefefe
| 384375 ||  || — || November 10, 2009 || Mayhill || iTelescope Obs. || — || align=right data-sort-value="0.98" | 980 m || 
|-id=376 bgcolor=#fefefe
| 384376 ||  || — || November 9, 2009 || Kachina || J. Hobart || NYS || align=right | 1.7 km || 
|-id=377 bgcolor=#fefefe
| 384377 ||  || — || November 8, 2009 || Mount Lemmon || Mount Lemmon Survey || V || align=right data-sort-value="0.67" | 670 m || 
|-id=378 bgcolor=#fefefe
| 384378 ||  || — || November 9, 2009 || La Sagra || OAM Obs. || — || align=right | 1.0 km || 
|-id=379 bgcolor=#fefefe
| 384379 ||  || — || November 8, 2009 || Kitt Peak || Spacewatch || — || align=right data-sort-value="0.91" | 910 m || 
|-id=380 bgcolor=#fefefe
| 384380 ||  || — || November 8, 2009 || Kitt Peak || Spacewatch || — || align=right data-sort-value="0.92" | 920 m || 
|-id=381 bgcolor=#fefefe
| 384381 ||  || — || November 8, 2009 || Mount Lemmon || Mount Lemmon Survey || V || align=right data-sort-value="0.76" | 760 m || 
|-id=382 bgcolor=#fefefe
| 384382 ||  || — || November 8, 2009 || Mount Lemmon || Mount Lemmon Survey || MAS || align=right data-sort-value="0.66" | 660 m || 
|-id=383 bgcolor=#fefefe
| 384383 ||  || — || November 11, 2009 || Socorro || LINEAR || — || align=right data-sort-value="0.75" | 750 m || 
|-id=384 bgcolor=#fefefe
| 384384 ||  || — || November 9, 2009 || Catalina || CSS || — || align=right data-sort-value="0.82" | 820 m || 
|-id=385 bgcolor=#fefefe
| 384385 ||  || — || May 9, 1996 || Kitt Peak || Spacewatch || — || align=right | 1.2 km || 
|-id=386 bgcolor=#E9E9E9
| 384386 ||  || — || November 9, 2009 || Mount Lemmon || Mount Lemmon Survey || — || align=right | 2.8 km || 
|-id=387 bgcolor=#E9E9E9
| 384387 ||  || — || November 9, 2009 || Kitt Peak || Spacewatch || KRM || align=right | 2.3 km || 
|-id=388 bgcolor=#fefefe
| 384388 ||  || — || October 9, 1999 || Kitt Peak || Spacewatch || — || align=right data-sort-value="0.90" | 900 m || 
|-id=389 bgcolor=#E9E9E9
| 384389 ||  || — || November 15, 2009 || Mount Lemmon || Mount Lemmon Survey || HNS || align=right | 1.4 km || 
|-id=390 bgcolor=#fefefe
| 384390 ||  || — || November 9, 2009 || Catalina || CSS || ERI || align=right | 1.9 km || 
|-id=391 bgcolor=#fefefe
| 384391 ||  || — || November 10, 2009 || Kitt Peak || Spacewatch || NYS || align=right data-sort-value="0.67" | 670 m || 
|-id=392 bgcolor=#fefefe
| 384392 ||  || — || November 11, 2009 || Catalina || CSS || — || align=right | 1.4 km || 
|-id=393 bgcolor=#fefefe
| 384393 ||  || — || November 15, 2009 || Catalina || CSS || V || align=right data-sort-value="0.76" | 760 m || 
|-id=394 bgcolor=#fefefe
| 384394 ||  || — || November 14, 2009 || La Sagra || OAM Obs. || — || align=right | 1.5 km || 
|-id=395 bgcolor=#E9E9E9
| 384395 ||  || — || November 9, 2009 || Mount Lemmon || Mount Lemmon Survey || — || align=right | 1.1 km || 
|-id=396 bgcolor=#fefefe
| 384396 ||  || — || August 28, 2005 || Kitt Peak || Spacewatch || NYS || align=right data-sort-value="0.58" | 580 m || 
|-id=397 bgcolor=#fefefe
| 384397 ||  || — || October 11, 2005 || Kitt Peak || Spacewatch || NYS || align=right data-sort-value="0.74" | 740 m || 
|-id=398 bgcolor=#fefefe
| 384398 ||  || — || November 16, 2009 || Kitt Peak || Spacewatch || — || align=right data-sort-value="0.71" | 710 m || 
|-id=399 bgcolor=#E9E9E9
| 384399 ||  || — || November 8, 2009 || Kitt Peak || Spacewatch || — || align=right | 1.1 km || 
|-id=400 bgcolor=#fefefe
| 384400 ||  || — || November 17, 2009 || Catalina || CSS || — || align=right data-sort-value="0.89" | 890 m || 
|}

384401–384500 

|-bgcolor=#E9E9E9
| 384401 ||  || — || November 17, 2009 || Catalina || CSS || — || align=right | 1.1 km || 
|-id=402 bgcolor=#fefefe
| 384402 ||  || — || November 18, 2009 || Kitt Peak || Spacewatch || — || align=right data-sort-value="0.75" | 750 m || 
|-id=403 bgcolor=#fefefe
| 384403 ||  || — || October 30, 2005 || Mount Lemmon || Mount Lemmon Survey || NYS || align=right data-sort-value="0.65" | 650 m || 
|-id=404 bgcolor=#fefefe
| 384404 ||  || — || March 11, 2007 || Kitt Peak || Spacewatch || NYS || align=right data-sort-value="0.87" | 870 m || 
|-id=405 bgcolor=#fefefe
| 384405 ||  || — || November 18, 2009 || Kitt Peak || Spacewatch || NYS || align=right data-sort-value="0.60" | 600 m || 
|-id=406 bgcolor=#fefefe
| 384406 ||  || — || November 18, 2009 || Kitt Peak || Spacewatch || NYS || align=right data-sort-value="0.55" | 550 m || 
|-id=407 bgcolor=#fefefe
| 384407 ||  || — || November 19, 2009 || Kitt Peak || Spacewatch || — || align=right data-sort-value="0.86" | 860 m || 
|-id=408 bgcolor=#fefefe
| 384408 ||  || — || November 19, 2009 || La Sagra || OAM Obs. || — || align=right | 1.3 km || 
|-id=409 bgcolor=#fefefe
| 384409 ||  || — || November 19, 2009 || La Sagra || OAM Obs. || V || align=right data-sort-value="0.85" | 850 m || 
|-id=410 bgcolor=#fefefe
| 384410 ||  || — || November 20, 2009 || Kitt Peak || Spacewatch || — || align=right | 1.00 km || 
|-id=411 bgcolor=#fefefe
| 384411 ||  || — || September 28, 2009 || Kitt Peak || Spacewatch || — || align=right data-sort-value="0.81" | 810 m || 
|-id=412 bgcolor=#E9E9E9
| 384412 ||  || — || November 21, 2009 || Kitt Peak || Spacewatch || KON || align=right | 1.7 km || 
|-id=413 bgcolor=#E9E9E9
| 384413 ||  || — || November 21, 2009 || Mount Lemmon || Mount Lemmon Survey || — || align=right | 1.0 km || 
|-id=414 bgcolor=#E9E9E9
| 384414 ||  || — || November 22, 2009 || Kitt Peak || Spacewatch || — || align=right | 1.3 km || 
|-id=415 bgcolor=#fefefe
| 384415 ||  || — || November 23, 2009 || Kitt Peak || Spacewatch || CLA || align=right | 1.2 km || 
|-id=416 bgcolor=#E9E9E9
| 384416 ||  || — || November 17, 2009 || Catalina || CSS || — || align=right | 1.8 km || 
|-id=417 bgcolor=#fefefe
| 384417 ||  || — || November 25, 2009 || Catalina || CSS || — || align=right | 1.0 km || 
|-id=418 bgcolor=#fefefe
| 384418 ||  || — || November 9, 2009 || Kitt Peak || Spacewatch || V || align=right data-sort-value="0.69" | 690 m || 
|-id=419 bgcolor=#fefefe
| 384419 ||  || — || November 17, 2009 || Mount Lemmon || Mount Lemmon Survey || — || align=right data-sort-value="0.64" | 640 m || 
|-id=420 bgcolor=#fefefe
| 384420 ||  || — || November 17, 2009 || Mount Lemmon || Mount Lemmon Survey || NYS || align=right | 1.8 km || 
|-id=421 bgcolor=#fefefe
| 384421 ||  || — || November 19, 2009 || Catalina || CSS || — || align=right | 1.6 km || 
|-id=422 bgcolor=#E9E9E9
| 384422 ||  || — || November 21, 2009 || Mount Lemmon || Mount Lemmon Survey || — || align=right | 1.8 km || 
|-id=423 bgcolor=#E9E9E9
| 384423 ||  || — || November 25, 2009 || Kitt Peak || Spacewatch || — || align=right | 1.5 km || 
|-id=424 bgcolor=#fefefe
| 384424 ||  || — || October 16, 2009 || Catalina || CSS || — || align=right data-sort-value="0.93" | 930 m || 
|-id=425 bgcolor=#E9E9E9
| 384425 ||  || — || December 13, 2009 || Bisei SG Center || BATTeRS || WIT || align=right | 1.1 km || 
|-id=426 bgcolor=#fefefe
| 384426 ||  || — || December 13, 2009 || Mount Lemmon || Mount Lemmon Survey || FLO || align=right data-sort-value="0.71" | 710 m || 
|-id=427 bgcolor=#fefefe
| 384427 ||  || — || December 15, 2009 || Mount Lemmon || Mount Lemmon Survey || — || align=right | 1.3 km || 
|-id=428 bgcolor=#fefefe
| 384428 ||  || — || December 15, 2009 || Mount Lemmon || Mount Lemmon Survey || — || align=right | 1.3 km || 
|-id=429 bgcolor=#fefefe
| 384429 ||  || — || December 15, 2009 || Mount Lemmon || Mount Lemmon Survey || — || align=right data-sort-value="0.98" | 980 m || 
|-id=430 bgcolor=#E9E9E9
| 384430 ||  || — || December 15, 2009 || Mount Lemmon || Mount Lemmon Survey || JUN || align=right | 1.2 km || 
|-id=431 bgcolor=#E9E9E9
| 384431 ||  || — || December 15, 2009 || Mount Lemmon || Mount Lemmon Survey || — || align=right | 1.6 km || 
|-id=432 bgcolor=#fefefe
| 384432 ||  || — || September 10, 2004 || Kitt Peak || Spacewatch || NYS || align=right data-sort-value="0.81" | 810 m || 
|-id=433 bgcolor=#E9E9E9
| 384433 ||  || — || December 18, 2009 || Mount Lemmon || Mount Lemmon Survey || — || align=right data-sort-value="0.81" | 810 m || 
|-id=434 bgcolor=#fefefe
| 384434 ||  || — || December 18, 2009 || Mount Lemmon || Mount Lemmon Survey || NYS || align=right data-sort-value="0.70" | 700 m || 
|-id=435 bgcolor=#E9E9E9
| 384435 ||  || — || December 27, 2009 || Kitt Peak || Spacewatch || — || align=right | 1.1 km || 
|-id=436 bgcolor=#fefefe
| 384436 ||  || — || December 20, 2009 || Mount Lemmon || Mount Lemmon Survey || — || align=right | 1.3 km || 
|-id=437 bgcolor=#E9E9E9
| 384437 ||  || — || December 19, 2009 || Kitt Peak || Spacewatch || — || align=right | 1.9 km || 
|-id=438 bgcolor=#E9E9E9
| 384438 ||  || — || January 5, 2010 || Kitt Peak || Spacewatch || EUN || align=right | 2.0 km || 
|-id=439 bgcolor=#E9E9E9
| 384439 ||  || — || January 6, 2010 || Kitt Peak || Spacewatch || — || align=right | 1.6 km || 
|-id=440 bgcolor=#E9E9E9
| 384440 ||  || — || January 5, 2010 || Kitt Peak || Spacewatch || — || align=right | 1.0 km || 
|-id=441 bgcolor=#E9E9E9
| 384441 ||  || — || January 6, 2010 || Kitt Peak || Spacewatch || — || align=right | 3.4 km || 
|-id=442 bgcolor=#E9E9E9
| 384442 ||  || — || September 3, 2008 || Kitt Peak || Spacewatch || — || align=right | 1.5 km || 
|-id=443 bgcolor=#E9E9E9
| 384443 ||  || — || November 21, 2009 || Mount Lemmon || Mount Lemmon Survey || — || align=right | 2.9 km || 
|-id=444 bgcolor=#E9E9E9
| 384444 ||  || — || November 15, 2009 || Mount Lemmon || Mount Lemmon Survey || — || align=right | 2.7 km || 
|-id=445 bgcolor=#E9E9E9
| 384445 ||  || — || January 6, 2010 || Kitt Peak || Spacewatch || HNS || align=right | 1.2 km || 
|-id=446 bgcolor=#E9E9E9
| 384446 ||  || — || January 6, 2010 || Catalina || CSS || HNS || align=right | 1.5 km || 
|-id=447 bgcolor=#E9E9E9
| 384447 ||  || — || August 22, 2004 || Kitt Peak || Spacewatch || — || align=right data-sort-value="0.88" | 880 m || 
|-id=448 bgcolor=#E9E9E9
| 384448 ||  || — || January 11, 2010 || Kitt Peak || Spacewatch || — || align=right | 1.9 km || 
|-id=449 bgcolor=#E9E9E9
| 384449 ||  || — || January 11, 2010 || Kitt Peak || Spacewatch || — || align=right | 1.7 km || 
|-id=450 bgcolor=#E9E9E9
| 384450 ||  || — || October 11, 2005 || Kitt Peak || Spacewatch || — || align=right | 1.0 km || 
|-id=451 bgcolor=#E9E9E9
| 384451 ||  || — || September 5, 2008 || Kitt Peak || Spacewatch || — || align=right | 2.1 km || 
|-id=452 bgcolor=#E9E9E9
| 384452 ||  || — || January 13, 2010 || Mount Lemmon || Mount Lemmon Survey || — || align=right | 2.1 km || 
|-id=453 bgcolor=#E9E9E9
| 384453 ||  || — || January 8, 2010 || WISE || WISE || — || align=right | 2.6 km || 
|-id=454 bgcolor=#d6d6d6
| 384454 ||  || — || January 12, 2010 || WISE || WISE || EUP || align=right | 4.6 km || 
|-id=455 bgcolor=#d6d6d6
| 384455 ||  || — || January 13, 2010 || WISE || WISE || — || align=right | 4.6 km || 
|-id=456 bgcolor=#d6d6d6
| 384456 ||  || — || January 7, 2010 || Kitt Peak || Spacewatch || — || align=right | 3.4 km || 
|-id=457 bgcolor=#E9E9E9
| 384457 ||  || — || October 8, 2008 || Mount Lemmon || Mount Lemmon Survey || WIT || align=right | 1.2 km || 
|-id=458 bgcolor=#E9E9E9
| 384458 ||  || — || January 18, 2010 || Gnosca || S. Sposetti || — || align=right | 1.1 km || 
|-id=459 bgcolor=#E9E9E9
| 384459 ||  || — || January 24, 2010 || Piszkéstető || Piszkéstető Stn. || — || align=right | 1.6 km || 
|-id=460 bgcolor=#E9E9E9
| 384460 ||  || — || January 23, 2010 || Bisei SG Center || BATTeRS || — || align=right | 1.1 km || 
|-id=461 bgcolor=#E9E9E9
| 384461 ||  || — || January 16, 2010 || WISE || WISE || DOR || align=right | 3.1 km || 
|-id=462 bgcolor=#d6d6d6
| 384462 ||  || — || January 17, 2010 || WISE || WISE || — || align=right | 6.8 km || 
|-id=463 bgcolor=#d6d6d6
| 384463 ||  || — || January 21, 2010 || WISE || WISE || — || align=right | 3.7 km || 
|-id=464 bgcolor=#d6d6d6
| 384464 ||  || — || January 21, 2010 || WISE || WISE || — || align=right | 4.6 km || 
|-id=465 bgcolor=#E9E9E9
| 384465 ||  || — || January 22, 2010 || WISE || WISE || — || align=right | 2.4 km || 
|-id=466 bgcolor=#d6d6d6
| 384466 ||  || — || January 23, 2010 || WISE || WISE || — || align=right | 5.7 km || 
|-id=467 bgcolor=#E9E9E9
| 384467 ||  || — || January 13, 1996 || Kitt Peak || Spacewatch || — || align=right | 2.5 km || 
|-id=468 bgcolor=#d6d6d6
| 384468 ||  || — || September 26, 2006 || Mount Lemmon || Mount Lemmon Survey || — || align=right | 3.5 km || 
|-id=469 bgcolor=#E9E9E9
| 384469 ||  || — || November 27, 2009 || Mount Lemmon || Mount Lemmon Survey || — || align=right | 2.3 km || 
|-id=470 bgcolor=#E9E9E9
| 384470 ||  || — || February 5, 2010 || Kitt Peak || Spacewatch || — || align=right | 3.0 km || 
|-id=471 bgcolor=#E9E9E9
| 384471 ||  || — || August 10, 2007 || Kitt Peak || Spacewatch || — || align=right | 2.7 km || 
|-id=472 bgcolor=#E9E9E9
| 384472 ||  || — || September 23, 2008 || Mount Lemmon || Mount Lemmon Survey || — || align=right | 1.5 km || 
|-id=473 bgcolor=#E9E9E9
| 384473 ||  || — || September 21, 2008 || Kitt Peak || Spacewatch || — || align=right | 1.8 km || 
|-id=474 bgcolor=#E9E9E9
| 384474 ||  || — || February 9, 2010 || Kitt Peak || Spacewatch || — || align=right | 2.2 km || 
|-id=475 bgcolor=#E9E9E9
| 384475 ||  || — || February 10, 2010 || Kitt Peak || Spacewatch || ADE || align=right | 2.1 km || 
|-id=476 bgcolor=#E9E9E9
| 384476 ||  || — || September 29, 2008 || Mount Lemmon || Mount Lemmon Survey || — || align=right | 1.6 km || 
|-id=477 bgcolor=#E9E9E9
| 384477 ||  || — || February 13, 2010 || Catalina || CSS || — || align=right | 1.5 km || 
|-id=478 bgcolor=#E9E9E9
| 384478 ||  || — || February 13, 2010 || Mount Lemmon || Mount Lemmon Survey || — || align=right | 1.6 km || 
|-id=479 bgcolor=#E9E9E9
| 384479 ||  || — || February 13, 2010 || Kitt Peak || Spacewatch || — || align=right | 1.5 km || 
|-id=480 bgcolor=#E9E9E9
| 384480 ||  || — || February 6, 2010 || Mount Lemmon || Mount Lemmon Survey || — || align=right | 1.6 km || 
|-id=481 bgcolor=#E9E9E9
| 384481 ||  || — || February 7, 2010 || La Sagra || OAM Obs. || HNS || align=right | 1.5 km || 
|-id=482 bgcolor=#E9E9E9
| 384482 ||  || — || February 13, 2010 || Mount Lemmon || Mount Lemmon Survey || — || align=right data-sort-value="0.90" | 900 m || 
|-id=483 bgcolor=#E9E9E9
| 384483 ||  || — || February 15, 2010 || Calvin-Rehoboth || Calvin–Rehoboth Obs. || EUN || align=right | 1.7 km || 
|-id=484 bgcolor=#E9E9E9
| 384484 ||  || — || February 13, 2010 || Socorro || LINEAR || — || align=right | 2.1 km || 
|-id=485 bgcolor=#E9E9E9
| 384485 ||  || — || February 13, 2010 || Socorro || LINEAR || — || align=right | 3.3 km || 
|-id=486 bgcolor=#E9E9E9
| 384486 ||  || — || September 21, 2008 || Mount Lemmon || Mount Lemmon Survey || — || align=right | 2.3 km || 
|-id=487 bgcolor=#E9E9E9
| 384487 ||  || — || February 9, 2010 || Catalina || CSS || — || align=right | 2.7 km || 
|-id=488 bgcolor=#E9E9E9
| 384488 ||  || — || February 9, 2010 || Kitt Peak || Spacewatch || — || align=right | 1.5 km || 
|-id=489 bgcolor=#E9E9E9
| 384489 ||  || — || February 9, 2010 || Kitt Peak || Spacewatch || — || align=right | 1.4 km || 
|-id=490 bgcolor=#E9E9E9
| 384490 ||  || — || February 9, 2010 || Kitt Peak || Spacewatch || — || align=right | 2.7 km || 
|-id=491 bgcolor=#E9E9E9
| 384491 ||  || — || February 10, 2010 || Kitt Peak || Spacewatch || — || align=right | 3.3 km || 
|-id=492 bgcolor=#E9E9E9
| 384492 ||  || — || February 13, 2010 || Mount Lemmon || Mount Lemmon Survey || MIS || align=right | 2.2 km || 
|-id=493 bgcolor=#E9E9E9
| 384493 ||  || — || February 13, 2010 || Kitt Peak || Spacewatch || DOR || align=right | 2.6 km || 
|-id=494 bgcolor=#E9E9E9
| 384494 ||  || — || February 13, 2010 || Catalina || CSS || — || align=right | 3.2 km || 
|-id=495 bgcolor=#d6d6d6
| 384495 ||  || — || February 3, 2000 || Kitt Peak || Spacewatch || KOR || align=right | 1.7 km || 
|-id=496 bgcolor=#E9E9E9
| 384496 ||  || — || February 13, 2010 || Kitt Peak || Spacewatch || — || align=right | 2.7 km || 
|-id=497 bgcolor=#E9E9E9
| 384497 ||  || — || October 7, 2008 || Mount Lemmon || Mount Lemmon Survey || NEM || align=right | 2.4 km || 
|-id=498 bgcolor=#E9E9E9
| 384498 ||  || — || February 14, 2010 || Mount Lemmon || Mount Lemmon Survey || HOF || align=right | 3.1 km || 
|-id=499 bgcolor=#E9E9E9
| 384499 ||  || — || February 14, 2010 || Kitt Peak || Spacewatch || — || align=right | 1.2 km || 
|-id=500 bgcolor=#d6d6d6
| 384500 ||  || — || February 14, 2010 || Kitt Peak || Spacewatch || — || align=right | 3.1 km || 
|}

384501–384600 

|-bgcolor=#E9E9E9
| 384501 ||  || — || February 14, 2010 || Mount Lemmon || Mount Lemmon Survey || — || align=right | 1.1 km || 
|-id=502 bgcolor=#E9E9E9
| 384502 ||  || — || September 24, 2008 || Mount Lemmon || Mount Lemmon Survey || — || align=right data-sort-value="0.97" | 970 m || 
|-id=503 bgcolor=#E9E9E9
| 384503 ||  || — || February 14, 2010 || Mount Lemmon || Mount Lemmon Survey || — || align=right | 1.7 km || 
|-id=504 bgcolor=#E9E9E9
| 384504 ||  || — || September 10, 2004 || Kitt Peak || Spacewatch || — || align=right data-sort-value="0.80" | 800 m || 
|-id=505 bgcolor=#E9E9E9
| 384505 ||  || — || February 15, 2010 || Kitt Peak || Spacewatch || — || align=right | 2.2 km || 
|-id=506 bgcolor=#E9E9E9
| 384506 ||  || — || February 15, 2010 || Catalina || CSS || ADE || align=right | 2.2 km || 
|-id=507 bgcolor=#E9E9E9
| 384507 ||  || — || February 15, 2010 || Catalina || CSS || — || align=right | 1.3 km || 
|-id=508 bgcolor=#E9E9E9
| 384508 ||  || — || November 27, 2009 || Mount Lemmon || Mount Lemmon Survey || — || align=right | 2.5 km || 
|-id=509 bgcolor=#E9E9E9
| 384509 ||  || — || February 15, 2010 || Mount Lemmon || Mount Lemmon Survey || — || align=right data-sort-value="0.82" | 820 m || 
|-id=510 bgcolor=#E9E9E9
| 384510 ||  || — || February 15, 2010 || Catalina || CSS || — || align=right | 2.1 km || 
|-id=511 bgcolor=#E9E9E9
| 384511 ||  || — || February 9, 2010 || Catalina || CSS || — || align=right | 3.1 km || 
|-id=512 bgcolor=#E9E9E9
| 384512 ||  || — || February 15, 2010 || Catalina || CSS || HNS || align=right | 1.5 km || 
|-id=513 bgcolor=#E9E9E9
| 384513 ||  || — || February 15, 2010 || Mount Lemmon || Mount Lemmon Survey || — || align=right | 2.2 km || 
|-id=514 bgcolor=#E9E9E9
| 384514 ||  || — || February 15, 2010 || Kitt Peak || Spacewatch || — || align=right | 1.6 km || 
|-id=515 bgcolor=#E9E9E9
| 384515 ||  || — || February 13, 2010 || Haleakala || Pan-STARRS || MIS || align=right | 1.9 km || 
|-id=516 bgcolor=#E9E9E9
| 384516 ||  || — || February 14, 2010 || Haleakala || Pan-STARRS || — || align=right | 1.3 km || 
|-id=517 bgcolor=#E9E9E9
| 384517 ||  || — || October 1, 2008 || Kitt Peak || Spacewatch || HOF || align=right | 3.6 km || 
|-id=518 bgcolor=#d6d6d6
| 384518 ||  || — || February 7, 2010 || WISE || WISE || — || align=right | 4.4 km || 
|-id=519 bgcolor=#E9E9E9
| 384519 ||  || — || July 18, 2007 || Mount Lemmon || Mount Lemmon Survey || MAR || align=right | 1.4 km || 
|-id=520 bgcolor=#E9E9E9
| 384520 ||  || — || February 17, 2010 || Socorro || LINEAR || — || align=right | 3.9 km || 
|-id=521 bgcolor=#E9E9E9
| 384521 ||  || — || February 16, 2010 || Kitt Peak || Spacewatch || — || align=right | 1.6 km || 
|-id=522 bgcolor=#E9E9E9
| 384522 ||  || — || February 16, 2010 || Mount Lemmon || Mount Lemmon Survey || — || align=right | 1.8 km || 
|-id=523 bgcolor=#d6d6d6
| 384523 ||  || — || February 17, 2010 || WISE || WISE || — || align=right | 5.5 km || 
|-id=524 bgcolor=#d6d6d6
| 384524 ||  || — || February 17, 2010 || WISE || WISE || — || align=right | 4.3 km || 
|-id=525 bgcolor=#E9E9E9
| 384525 ||  || — || January 8, 2010 || Kitt Peak || Spacewatch || — || align=right | 1.5 km || 
|-id=526 bgcolor=#E9E9E9
| 384526 ||  || — || February 16, 2010 || Kitt Peak || Spacewatch || — || align=right | 2.5 km || 
|-id=527 bgcolor=#E9E9E9
| 384527 ||  || — || February 16, 2010 || Kitt Peak || Spacewatch || — || align=right | 2.3 km || 
|-id=528 bgcolor=#d6d6d6
| 384528 ||  || — || December 20, 2004 || Mount Lemmon || Mount Lemmon Survey || — || align=right | 2.3 km || 
|-id=529 bgcolor=#E9E9E9
| 384529 ||  || — || February 16, 2010 || Kitt Peak || Spacewatch || AGN || align=right | 1.3 km || 
|-id=530 bgcolor=#E9E9E9
| 384530 ||  || — || February 17, 2010 || Kitt Peak || Spacewatch || RAF || align=right | 1.7 km || 
|-id=531 bgcolor=#d6d6d6
| 384531 ||  || — || February 22, 2010 || WISE || WISE || EOS || align=right | 3.8 km || 
|-id=532 bgcolor=#E9E9E9
| 384532 ||  || — || November 1, 2008 || Mount Lemmon || Mount Lemmon Survey || — || align=right | 1.7 km || 
|-id=533 bgcolor=#d6d6d6
| 384533 Tenerelli ||  ||  || February 23, 2010 || WISE || WISE || — || align=right | 3.7 km || 
|-id=534 bgcolor=#d6d6d6
| 384534 ||  || — || February 27, 2010 || WISE || WISE || — || align=right | 4.8 km || 
|-id=535 bgcolor=#E9E9E9
| 384535 ||  || — || February 17, 2010 || Kitt Peak || Spacewatch || — || align=right | 2.0 km || 
|-id=536 bgcolor=#E9E9E9
| 384536 ||  || — || September 27, 2008 || Mount Lemmon || Mount Lemmon Survey || EUN || align=right | 1.5 km || 
|-id=537 bgcolor=#d6d6d6
| 384537 ||  || — || February 16, 2010 || Haleakala || Pan-STARRS || BRA || align=right | 2.0 km || 
|-id=538 bgcolor=#d6d6d6
| 384538 ||  || — || March 1, 2010 || WISE || WISE || — || align=right | 3.7 km || 
|-id=539 bgcolor=#d6d6d6
| 384539 ||  || — || March 9, 2010 || Taunus || E. Schwab, R. Kling || — || align=right | 4.0 km || 
|-id=540 bgcolor=#E9E9E9
| 384540 ||  || — || October 26, 2008 || Mount Lemmon || Mount Lemmon Survey || — || align=right | 1.7 km || 
|-id=541 bgcolor=#E9E9E9
| 384541 ||  || — || March 10, 2010 || La Sagra || OAM Obs. || AGN || align=right | 1.6 km || 
|-id=542 bgcolor=#d6d6d6
| 384542 ||  || — || March 4, 2010 || Kitt Peak || Spacewatch || — || align=right | 3.4 km || 
|-id=543 bgcolor=#E9E9E9
| 384543 ||  || — || March 10, 2010 || La Sagra || OAM Obs. || — || align=right | 2.1 km || 
|-id=544 bgcolor=#E9E9E9
| 384544 ||  || — || March 10, 2010 || La Sagra || OAM Obs. || — || align=right | 1.6 km || 
|-id=545 bgcolor=#fefefe
| 384545 ||  || — || February 13, 2010 || Mount Lemmon || Mount Lemmon Survey || — || align=right | 1.8 km || 
|-id=546 bgcolor=#E9E9E9
| 384546 ||  || — || March 12, 2010 || Mount Lemmon || Mount Lemmon Survey || AGN || align=right | 1.1 km || 
|-id=547 bgcolor=#E9E9E9
| 384547 ||  || — || March 12, 2010 || Mount Lemmon || Mount Lemmon Survey || — || align=right | 2.0 km || 
|-id=548 bgcolor=#d6d6d6
| 384548 ||  || — || March 12, 2010 || Kitt Peak || Spacewatch || ITH || align=right | 1.2 km || 
|-id=549 bgcolor=#d6d6d6
| 384549 ||  || — || March 12, 2010 || Kitt Peak || Spacewatch || — || align=right | 4.1 km || 
|-id=550 bgcolor=#E9E9E9
| 384550 ||  || — || March 5, 2010 || Catalina || CSS || — || align=right | 2.2 km || 
|-id=551 bgcolor=#E9E9E9
| 384551 ||  || — || November 3, 2008 || Mount Lemmon || Mount Lemmon Survey || — || align=right | 2.1 km || 
|-id=552 bgcolor=#d6d6d6
| 384552 ||  || — || March 15, 2010 || Kitt Peak || Spacewatch || — || align=right | 3.2 km || 
|-id=553 bgcolor=#d6d6d6
| 384553 ||  || — || November 23, 1995 || Kitt Peak || Spacewatch || HYG || align=right | 5.2 km || 
|-id=554 bgcolor=#d6d6d6
| 384554 ||  || — || March 16, 2010 || Kitt Peak || Spacewatch || — || align=right | 2.2 km || 
|-id=555 bgcolor=#d6d6d6
| 384555 ||  || — || February 18, 2010 || Mount Lemmon || Mount Lemmon Survey || — || align=right | 3.2 km || 
|-id=556 bgcolor=#E9E9E9
| 384556 ||  || — || March 16, 2010 || Purple Mountain || PMO NEO || JUN || align=right | 1.2 km || 
|-id=557 bgcolor=#d6d6d6
| 384557 ||  || — || November 18, 2008 || Kitt Peak || Spacewatch || — || align=right | 2.4 km || 
|-id=558 bgcolor=#d6d6d6
| 384558 ||  || — || March 20, 2010 || Mount Lemmon || Mount Lemmon Survey || — || align=right | 3.4 km || 
|-id=559 bgcolor=#E9E9E9
| 384559 ||  || — || March 5, 2006 || Kitt Peak || Spacewatch || — || align=right | 2.6 km || 
|-id=560 bgcolor=#d6d6d6
| 384560 ||  || — || March 18, 2010 || Kitt Peak || Spacewatch || EOS || align=right | 2.4 km || 
|-id=561 bgcolor=#d6d6d6
| 384561 ||  || — || March 23, 2010 || Mount Lemmon || Mount Lemmon Survey || — || align=right | 1.9 km || 
|-id=562 bgcolor=#E9E9E9
| 384562 ||  || — || March 21, 2010 || Kitt Peak || Spacewatch || — || align=right | 2.2 km || 
|-id=563 bgcolor=#d6d6d6
| 384563 ||  || — || March 12, 2010 || Mount Lemmon || Mount Lemmon Survey || EOS || align=right | 1.8 km || 
|-id=564 bgcolor=#d6d6d6
| 384564 ||  || — || April 4, 2010 || Kitt Peak || Spacewatch || — || align=right | 2.2 km || 
|-id=565 bgcolor=#E9E9E9
| 384565 ||  || — || April 5, 2010 || Kitt Peak || Spacewatch || INO || align=right | 1.4 km || 
|-id=566 bgcolor=#d6d6d6
| 384566 ||  || — || April 4, 2010 || Kitt Peak || Spacewatch || — || align=right | 2.4 km || 
|-id=567 bgcolor=#E9E9E9
| 384567 ||  || — || September 22, 2008 || Kitt Peak || Spacewatch || — || align=right data-sort-value="0.97" | 970 m || 
|-id=568 bgcolor=#d6d6d6
| 384568 ||  || — || April 7, 2010 || Kitt Peak || Spacewatch || — || align=right | 3.3 km || 
|-id=569 bgcolor=#E9E9E9
| 384569 ||  || — || January 20, 2010 || WISE || WISE || — || align=right | 2.7 km || 
|-id=570 bgcolor=#E9E9E9
| 384570 ||  || — || February 1, 2010 || WISE || WISE || — || align=right | 3.2 km || 
|-id=571 bgcolor=#E9E9E9
| 384571 ||  || — || October 29, 2003 || Anderson Mesa || LONEOS || AGN || align=right | 1.6 km || 
|-id=572 bgcolor=#E9E9E9
| 384572 ||  || — || January 14, 2010 || WISE || WISE || — || align=right | 2.7 km || 
|-id=573 bgcolor=#E9E9E9
| 384573 ||  || — || January 15, 2005 || Kitt Peak || Spacewatch || GAL || align=right | 1.8 km || 
|-id=574 bgcolor=#fefefe
| 384574 ||  || — || May 25, 1995 || Kitt Peak || Spacewatch || V || align=right data-sort-value="0.99" | 990 m || 
|-id=575 bgcolor=#d6d6d6
| 384575 ||  || — || May 12, 2005 || Mount Lemmon || Mount Lemmon Survey || — || align=right | 3.6 km || 
|-id=576 bgcolor=#E9E9E9
| 384576 ||  || — || December 22, 2000 || Kitt Peak || Spacewatch || — || align=right | 1.9 km || 
|-id=577 bgcolor=#E9E9E9
| 384577 ||  || — || February 18, 2010 || Kitt Peak || Spacewatch || — || align=right | 1.6 km || 
|-id=578 bgcolor=#E9E9E9
| 384578 ||  || — || October 8, 2008 || Mount Lemmon || Mount Lemmon Survey || — || align=right | 1.7 km || 
|-id=579 bgcolor=#E9E9E9
| 384579 ||  || — || November 19, 2009 || Mount Lemmon || Mount Lemmon Survey || — || align=right | 3.1 km || 
|-id=580 bgcolor=#d6d6d6
| 384580 ||  || — || April 26, 2010 || Mount Lemmon || Mount Lemmon Survey || CRO || align=right | 4.0 km || 
|-id=581 bgcolor=#E9E9E9
| 384581 ||  || — || March 20, 2010 || Catalina || CSS || GEF || align=right | 1.7 km || 
|-id=582 bgcolor=#fefefe
| 384582 Juliasmith ||  ||  || May 2, 2010 || WISE || WISE || ERI || align=right | 2.5 km || 
|-id=583 bgcolor=#E9E9E9
| 384583 ||  || — || February 13, 2010 || WISE || WISE || EUN || align=right | 2.1 km || 
|-id=584 bgcolor=#E9E9E9
| 384584 ||  || — || January 16, 2010 || WISE || WISE || — || align=right | 3.5 km || 
|-id=585 bgcolor=#d6d6d6
| 384585 ||  || — || May 6, 2010 || Kitt Peak || Spacewatch || — || align=right | 3.5 km || 
|-id=586 bgcolor=#d6d6d6
| 384586 ||  || — || May 4, 2010 || Kitt Peak || Spacewatch || — || align=right | 3.1 km || 
|-id=587 bgcolor=#d6d6d6
| 384587 ||  || — || February 14, 2010 || Mount Lemmon || Mount Lemmon Survey || TEL || align=right | 1.6 km || 
|-id=588 bgcolor=#d6d6d6
| 384588 ||  || — || April 9, 2010 || Kitt Peak || Spacewatch || — || align=right | 3.9 km || 
|-id=589 bgcolor=#E9E9E9
| 384589 ||  || — || September 14, 1998 || Kitt Peak || Spacewatch || — || align=right | 3.1 km || 
|-id=590 bgcolor=#E9E9E9
| 384590 ||  || — || May 19, 2010 || WISE || WISE || — || align=right | 2.3 km || 
|-id=591 bgcolor=#d6d6d6
| 384591 ||  || — || June 3, 2010 || Kitt Peak || Spacewatch || — || align=right | 4.0 km || 
|-id=592 bgcolor=#E9E9E9
| 384592 ||  || — || June 6, 2010 || WISE || WISE || — || align=right | 3.2 km || 
|-id=593 bgcolor=#d6d6d6
| 384593 ||  || — || October 19, 2007 || Catalina || CSS || — || align=right | 4.5 km || 
|-id=594 bgcolor=#E9E9E9
| 384594 ||  || — || March 20, 2010 || Siding Spring || SSS || ADE || align=right | 3.0 km || 
|-id=595 bgcolor=#d6d6d6
| 384595 ||  || — || January 27, 2010 || WISE || WISE || — || align=right | 5.3 km || 
|-id=596 bgcolor=#d6d6d6
| 384596 ||  || — || July 17, 2010 || WISE || WISE || — || align=right | 5.3 km || 
|-id=597 bgcolor=#d6d6d6
| 384597 ||  || — || June 6, 2005 || Kitt Peak || Spacewatch || EUP || align=right | 5.7 km || 
|-id=598 bgcolor=#d6d6d6
| 384598 ||  || — || July 24, 2010 || WISE || WISE || — || align=right | 3.8 km || 
|-id=599 bgcolor=#d6d6d6
| 384599 ||  || — || January 30, 2010 || WISE || WISE || EOS || align=right | 3.6 km || 
|-id=600 bgcolor=#d6d6d6
| 384600 ||  || — || July 28, 2010 || WISE || WISE || LIX || align=right | 5.1 km || 
|}

384601–384700 

|-bgcolor=#E9E9E9
| 384601 ||  || — || January 29, 2010 || WISE || WISE || — || align=right | 2.7 km || 
|-id=602 bgcolor=#fefefe
| 384602 ||  || — || September 10, 2010 || La Sagra || OAM Obs. || H || align=right data-sort-value="0.81" | 810 m || 
|-id=603 bgcolor=#fefefe
| 384603 ||  || — || October 1, 2010 || Catalina || CSS || H || align=right data-sort-value="0.63" | 630 m || 
|-id=604 bgcolor=#fefefe
| 384604 ||  || — || May 19, 2004 || Socorro || LINEAR || H || align=right data-sort-value="0.61" | 610 m || 
|-id=605 bgcolor=#fefefe
| 384605 ||  || — || August 31, 2003 || Kitt Peak || Spacewatch || — || align=right data-sort-value="0.51" | 510 m || 
|-id=606 bgcolor=#fefefe
| 384606 ||  || — || March 25, 2009 || Mount Lemmon || Mount Lemmon Survey || H || align=right data-sort-value="0.56" | 560 m || 
|-id=607 bgcolor=#fefefe
| 384607 ||  || — || October 17, 2003 || Kitt Peak || Spacewatch || — || align=right data-sort-value="0.77" | 770 m || 
|-id=608 bgcolor=#fefefe
| 384608 ||  || — || November 28, 2000 || Kitt Peak || Spacewatch || FLO || align=right data-sort-value="0.52" | 520 m || 
|-id=609 bgcolor=#fefefe
| 384609 ||  || — || November 24, 2003 || Kitt Peak || Spacewatch || FLO || align=right data-sort-value="0.45" | 450 m || 
|-id=610 bgcolor=#fefefe
| 384610 ||  || — || October 17, 2003 || Kitt Peak || Spacewatch || — || align=right data-sort-value="0.75" | 750 m || 
|-id=611 bgcolor=#fefefe
| 384611 ||  || — || September 16, 2009 || Kitt Peak || Spacewatch || — || align=right data-sort-value="0.77" | 770 m || 
|-id=612 bgcolor=#fefefe
| 384612 ||  || — || November 15, 2006 || Kitt Peak || Spacewatch || V || align=right data-sort-value="0.68" | 680 m || 
|-id=613 bgcolor=#fefefe
| 384613 ||  || — || October 18, 2006 || Kitt Peak || Spacewatch || — || align=right data-sort-value="0.85" | 850 m || 
|-id=614 bgcolor=#fefefe
| 384614 ||  || — || January 13, 2011 || Kitt Peak || Spacewatch || — || align=right data-sort-value="0.77" | 770 m || 
|-id=615 bgcolor=#fefefe
| 384615 ||  || — || December 19, 2003 || Socorro || LINEAR || — || align=right data-sort-value="0.66" | 660 m || 
|-id=616 bgcolor=#fefefe
| 384616 ||  || — || March 7, 2008 || Kitt Peak || Spacewatch || — || align=right data-sort-value="0.84" | 840 m || 
|-id=617 bgcolor=#fefefe
| 384617 ||  || — || April 8, 2008 || Kitt Peak || Spacewatch || NYS || align=right data-sort-value="0.61" | 610 m || 
|-id=618 bgcolor=#fefefe
| 384618 ||  || — || September 27, 2006 || Catalina || CSS || — || align=right data-sort-value="0.76" | 760 m || 
|-id=619 bgcolor=#fefefe
| 384619 ||  || — || April 3, 2008 || Mount Lemmon || Mount Lemmon Survey || — || align=right data-sort-value="0.78" | 780 m || 
|-id=620 bgcolor=#fefefe
| 384620 ||  || — || September 28, 2009 || Kitt Peak || Spacewatch || — || align=right data-sort-value="0.69" | 690 m || 
|-id=621 bgcolor=#fefefe
| 384621 ||  || — || March 18, 2004 || Socorro || LINEAR || V || align=right data-sort-value="0.78" | 780 m || 
|-id=622 bgcolor=#fefefe
| 384622 ||  || — || September 22, 2009 || Kitt Peak || Spacewatch || — || align=right data-sort-value="0.71" | 710 m || 
|-id=623 bgcolor=#fefefe
| 384623 ||  || — || November 11, 2006 || Mount Lemmon || Mount Lemmon Survey || — || align=right data-sort-value="0.60" | 600 m || 
|-id=624 bgcolor=#fefefe
| 384624 ||  || — || August 28, 2006 || Kitt Peak || Spacewatch || — || align=right data-sort-value="0.57" | 570 m || 
|-id=625 bgcolor=#fefefe
| 384625 ||  || — || June 17, 2005 || Mount Lemmon || Mount Lemmon Survey || V || align=right data-sort-value="0.81" | 810 m || 
|-id=626 bgcolor=#fefefe
| 384626 ||  || — || July 16, 2001 || Anderson Mesa || LONEOS || — || align=right | 1.3 km || 
|-id=627 bgcolor=#fefefe
| 384627 ||  || — || February 10, 2007 || Mount Lemmon || Mount Lemmon Survey || V || align=right data-sort-value="0.77" | 770 m || 
|-id=628 bgcolor=#fefefe
| 384628 ||  || — || December 14, 2010 || Mount Lemmon || Mount Lemmon Survey || — || align=right data-sort-value="0.98" | 980 m || 
|-id=629 bgcolor=#fefefe
| 384629 ||  || — || December 9, 2006 || Kitt Peak || Spacewatch || — || align=right data-sort-value="0.84" | 840 m || 
|-id=630 bgcolor=#fefefe
| 384630 ||  || — || April 26, 2008 || Kitt Peak || Spacewatch || — || align=right data-sort-value="0.79" | 790 m || 
|-id=631 bgcolor=#fefefe
| 384631 ||  || — || September 28, 2009 || Mount Lemmon || Mount Lemmon Survey || — || align=right | 1.0 km || 
|-id=632 bgcolor=#fefefe
| 384632 ||  || — || October 3, 2003 || Kitt Peak || Spacewatch || — || align=right data-sort-value="0.71" | 710 m || 
|-id=633 bgcolor=#fefefe
| 384633 ||  || — || February 25, 2011 || Catalina || CSS || NYS || align=right data-sort-value="0.79" | 790 m || 
|-id=634 bgcolor=#fefefe
| 384634 ||  || — || October 2, 2006 || Mount Lemmon || Mount Lemmon Survey || FLO || align=right data-sort-value="0.64" | 640 m || 
|-id=635 bgcolor=#fefefe
| 384635 ||  || — || April 29, 2008 || Kitt Peak || Spacewatch || NYS || align=right data-sort-value="0.63" | 630 m || 
|-id=636 bgcolor=#fefefe
| 384636 ||  || — || April 27, 2000 || Kitt Peak || Spacewatch || SUL || align=right | 2.2 km || 
|-id=637 bgcolor=#fefefe
| 384637 ||  || — || September 17, 2009 || Kitt Peak || Spacewatch || FLO || align=right data-sort-value="0.70" | 700 m || 
|-id=638 bgcolor=#fefefe
| 384638 ||  || — || June 10, 2004 || Socorro || LINEAR || PHO || align=right | 1.3 km || 
|-id=639 bgcolor=#E9E9E9
| 384639 ||  || — || August 7, 2008 || Kitt Peak || Spacewatch || — || align=right | 1.8 km || 
|-id=640 bgcolor=#fefefe
| 384640 ||  || — || March 18, 2004 || Kitt Peak || Spacewatch || NYS || align=right data-sort-value="0.78" | 780 m || 
|-id=641 bgcolor=#fefefe
| 384641 ||  || — || November 17, 2006 || Mount Lemmon || Mount Lemmon Survey || — || align=right data-sort-value="0.94" | 940 m || 
|-id=642 bgcolor=#fefefe
| 384642 ||  || — || November 17, 2009 || Mount Lemmon || Mount Lemmon Survey || — || align=right data-sort-value="0.77" | 770 m || 
|-id=643 bgcolor=#E9E9E9
| 384643 ||  || — || March 6, 2010 || WISE || WISE || GER || align=right | 1.5 km || 
|-id=644 bgcolor=#fefefe
| 384644 ||  || — || February 13, 2004 || Kitt Peak || Spacewatch || FLO || align=right data-sort-value="0.75" | 750 m || 
|-id=645 bgcolor=#fefefe
| 384645 ||  || — || December 11, 2006 || Kitt Peak || Spacewatch || — || align=right data-sort-value="0.91" | 910 m || 
|-id=646 bgcolor=#fefefe
| 384646 ||  || — || July 9, 2005 || Kitt Peak || Spacewatch || — || align=right data-sort-value="0.87" | 870 m || 
|-id=647 bgcolor=#fefefe
| 384647 ||  || — || March 4, 1994 || Kitt Peak || Spacewatch || — || align=right data-sort-value="0.80" | 800 m || 
|-id=648 bgcolor=#fefefe
| 384648 ||  || — || October 1, 2005 || Kitt Peak || Spacewatch || — || align=right data-sort-value="0.92" | 920 m || 
|-id=649 bgcolor=#fefefe
| 384649 ||  || — || March 13, 2011 || Kitt Peak || Spacewatch || — || align=right | 1.1 km || 
|-id=650 bgcolor=#fefefe
| 384650 ||  || — || January 5, 2000 || Kitt Peak || Spacewatch || NYS || align=right data-sort-value="0.69" | 690 m || 
|-id=651 bgcolor=#fefefe
| 384651 ||  || — || May 16, 2008 || Kitt Peak || Spacewatch || — || align=right data-sort-value="0.78" | 780 m || 
|-id=652 bgcolor=#fefefe
| 384652 ||  || — || March 15, 2004 || Kitt Peak || Spacewatch || — || align=right data-sort-value="0.87" | 870 m || 
|-id=653 bgcolor=#fefefe
| 384653 ||  || — || December 19, 2003 || Kitt Peak || Spacewatch || — || align=right data-sort-value="0.72" | 720 m || 
|-id=654 bgcolor=#fefefe
| 384654 ||  || — || November 25, 2006 || Kitt Peak || Spacewatch || — || align=right data-sort-value="0.64" | 640 m || 
|-id=655 bgcolor=#fefefe
| 384655 ||  || — || October 31, 2006 || Kitt Peak || Spacewatch || — || align=right data-sort-value="0.82" | 820 m || 
|-id=656 bgcolor=#fefefe
| 384656 ||  || — || May 9, 2004 || Kitt Peak || Spacewatch || NYS || align=right data-sort-value="0.71" | 710 m || 
|-id=657 bgcolor=#E9E9E9
| 384657 ||  || — || April 18, 2007 || Kitt Peak || Spacewatch || — || align=right | 1.1 km || 
|-id=658 bgcolor=#E9E9E9
| 384658 ||  || — || September 23, 2008 || Mount Lemmon || Mount Lemmon Survey || WIT || align=right | 1.0 km || 
|-id=659 bgcolor=#fefefe
| 384659 ||  || — || April 20, 2004 || Siding Spring || SSS || — || align=right | 1.0 km || 
|-id=660 bgcolor=#d6d6d6
| 384660 ||  || — || March 8, 2005 || Kitt Peak || Spacewatch || HYG || align=right | 3.7 km || 
|-id=661 bgcolor=#E9E9E9
| 384661 ||  || — || March 27, 2011 || Mount Lemmon || Mount Lemmon Survey || — || align=right | 1.8 km || 
|-id=662 bgcolor=#fefefe
| 384662 ||  || — || October 24, 2009 || Kitt Peak || Spacewatch || FLO || align=right data-sort-value="0.75" | 750 m || 
|-id=663 bgcolor=#E9E9E9
| 384663 ||  || — || July 20, 2004 || Siding Spring || SSS || — || align=right | 1.8 km || 
|-id=664 bgcolor=#fefefe
| 384664 ||  || — || January 28, 2007 || Kitt Peak || Spacewatch || — || align=right data-sort-value="0.77" | 770 m || 
|-id=665 bgcolor=#fefefe
| 384665 ||  || — || March 15, 2004 || Catalina || CSS || NYS || align=right data-sort-value="0.69" | 690 m || 
|-id=666 bgcolor=#fefefe
| 384666 ||  || — || July 4, 2005 || Mount Lemmon || Mount Lemmon Survey || FLO || align=right data-sort-value="0.71" | 710 m || 
|-id=667 bgcolor=#fefefe
| 384667 ||  || — || November 22, 2009 || Mount Lemmon || Mount Lemmon Survey || — || align=right | 1.0 km || 
|-id=668 bgcolor=#fefefe
| 384668 ||  || — || May 15, 2004 || Socorro || LINEAR || V || align=right data-sort-value="0.87" | 870 m || 
|-id=669 bgcolor=#fefefe
| 384669 ||  || — || December 12, 2006 || Kitt Peak || Spacewatch || V || align=right data-sort-value="0.78" | 780 m || 
|-id=670 bgcolor=#fefefe
| 384670 ||  || — || May 13, 2004 || Kitt Peak || Spacewatch || — || align=right data-sort-value="0.94" | 940 m || 
|-id=671 bgcolor=#fefefe
| 384671 ||  || — || February 23, 2007 || Kitt Peak || Spacewatch || — || align=right data-sort-value="0.78" | 780 m || 
|-id=672 bgcolor=#fefefe
| 384672 ||  || — || September 26, 2009 || Kitt Peak || Spacewatch || NYS || align=right data-sort-value="0.57" | 570 m || 
|-id=673 bgcolor=#fefefe
| 384673 ||  || — || April 19, 2004 || Kitt Peak || Spacewatch || MAS || align=right data-sort-value="0.59" | 590 m || 
|-id=674 bgcolor=#fefefe
| 384674 ||  || — || March 2, 2011 || Kitt Peak || Spacewatch || — || align=right data-sort-value="0.88" | 880 m || 
|-id=675 bgcolor=#fefefe
| 384675 ||  || — || February 29, 2000 || Socorro || LINEAR || NYS || align=right data-sort-value="0.68" | 680 m || 
|-id=676 bgcolor=#fefefe
| 384676 ||  || — || December 1, 2006 || Mount Lemmon || Mount Lemmon Survey || — || align=right data-sort-value="0.89" | 890 m || 
|-id=677 bgcolor=#E9E9E9
| 384677 ||  || — || September 17, 2004 || Kitt Peak || Spacewatch || — || align=right | 1.6 km || 
|-id=678 bgcolor=#fefefe
| 384678 ||  || — || September 29, 2005 || Kitt Peak || Spacewatch || — || align=right data-sort-value="0.91" | 910 m || 
|-id=679 bgcolor=#fefefe
| 384679 ||  || — || November 24, 2009 || Kitt Peak || Spacewatch || FLO || align=right data-sort-value="0.58" | 580 m || 
|-id=680 bgcolor=#fefefe
| 384680 ||  || — || March 3, 1997 || Kitt Peak || Spacewatch || FLO || align=right data-sort-value="0.65" | 650 m || 
|-id=681 bgcolor=#fefefe
| 384681 ||  || — || May 13, 2004 || Kitt Peak || Spacewatch || NYS || align=right data-sort-value="0.55" | 550 m || 
|-id=682 bgcolor=#fefefe
| 384682 ||  || — || November 20, 2006 || Mount Lemmon || Mount Lemmon Survey || NYS || align=right data-sort-value="0.52" | 520 m || 
|-id=683 bgcolor=#E9E9E9
| 384683 ||  || — || September 2, 2008 || Kitt Peak || Spacewatch || — || align=right | 1.3 km || 
|-id=684 bgcolor=#E9E9E9
| 384684 ||  || — || December 26, 2009 || Kitt Peak || Spacewatch || — || align=right | 2.3 km || 
|-id=685 bgcolor=#fefefe
| 384685 ||  || — || January 17, 2007 || Catalina || CSS || — || align=right | 1.0 km || 
|-id=686 bgcolor=#fefefe
| 384686 ||  || — || December 27, 2006 || Mount Lemmon || Mount Lemmon Survey || — || align=right data-sort-value="0.80" | 800 m || 
|-id=687 bgcolor=#fefefe
| 384687 ||  || — || October 16, 2009 || Mount Lemmon || Mount Lemmon Survey || — || align=right data-sort-value="0.80" | 800 m || 
|-id=688 bgcolor=#E9E9E9
| 384688 ||  || — || April 22, 2007 || Mount Lemmon || Mount Lemmon Survey || — || align=right data-sort-value="0.96" | 960 m || 
|-id=689 bgcolor=#fefefe
| 384689 ||  || — || March 23, 2004 || Socorro || LINEAR || — || align=right data-sort-value="0.68" | 680 m || 
|-id=690 bgcolor=#fefefe
| 384690 ||  || — || November 26, 2009 || Mount Lemmon || Mount Lemmon Survey || — || align=right | 1.0 km || 
|-id=691 bgcolor=#E9E9E9
| 384691 ||  || — || January 28, 2006 || Mount Lemmon || Mount Lemmon Survey || — || align=right | 2.6 km || 
|-id=692 bgcolor=#fefefe
| 384692 ||  || — || October 23, 2009 || Mount Lemmon || Mount Lemmon Survey || — || align=right data-sort-value="0.78" | 780 m || 
|-id=693 bgcolor=#fefefe
| 384693 ||  || — || October 20, 2005 || Mount Lemmon || Mount Lemmon Survey || V || align=right data-sort-value="0.68" | 680 m || 
|-id=694 bgcolor=#E9E9E9
| 384694 ||  || — || October 26, 2008 || Mount Lemmon || Mount Lemmon Survey || EUN || align=right | 1.8 km || 
|-id=695 bgcolor=#fefefe
| 384695 ||  || — || November 27, 2009 || Kitt Peak || Spacewatch || V || align=right data-sort-value="0.85" | 850 m || 
|-id=696 bgcolor=#E9E9E9
| 384696 ||  || — || January 4, 2006 || Catalina || CSS || — || align=right | 2.4 km || 
|-id=697 bgcolor=#fefefe
| 384697 ||  || — || April 12, 2011 || Catalina || CSS || — || align=right | 1.2 km || 
|-id=698 bgcolor=#E9E9E9
| 384698 ||  || — || May 12, 2007 || Mount Lemmon || Mount Lemmon Survey || — || align=right data-sort-value="0.98" | 980 m || 
|-id=699 bgcolor=#d6d6d6
| 384699 ||  || — || May 18, 2010 || WISE || WISE || — || align=right | 4.2 km || 
|-id=700 bgcolor=#fefefe
| 384700 ||  || — || February 17, 2007 || Kitt Peak || Spacewatch || MAS || align=right data-sort-value="0.82" | 820 m || 
|}

384701–384800 

|-bgcolor=#d6d6d6
| 384701 ||  || — || April 11, 2011 || Mount Lemmon || Mount Lemmon Survey || VER || align=right | 3.5 km || 
|-id=702 bgcolor=#fefefe
| 384702 ||  || — || January 27, 2000 || Kitt Peak || Spacewatch || FLO || align=right data-sort-value="0.71" | 710 m || 
|-id=703 bgcolor=#fefefe
| 384703 ||  || — || March 16, 2004 || Kitt Peak || Spacewatch || — || align=right data-sort-value="0.83" | 830 m || 
|-id=704 bgcolor=#fefefe
| 384704 ||  || — || October 27, 2005 || Kitt Peak || Spacewatch || NYS || align=right data-sort-value="0.69" | 690 m || 
|-id=705 bgcolor=#fefefe
| 384705 ||  || — || January 17, 2007 || Kitt Peak || Spacewatch || — || align=right data-sort-value="0.66" | 660 m || 
|-id=706 bgcolor=#E9E9E9
| 384706 ||  || — || November 4, 2004 || Kitt Peak || Spacewatch || — || align=right | 2.7 km || 
|-id=707 bgcolor=#E9E9E9
| 384707 ||  || — || September 29, 2008 || Catalina || CSS || — || align=right | 2.1 km || 
|-id=708 bgcolor=#E9E9E9
| 384708 ||  || — || December 20, 2009 || Kitt Peak || Spacewatch || EUN || align=right | 1.2 km || 
|-id=709 bgcolor=#fefefe
| 384709 ||  || — || March 13, 2007 || Kitt Peak || Spacewatch || — || align=right | 1.2 km || 
|-id=710 bgcolor=#E9E9E9
| 384710 ||  || — || October 29, 2008 || Kitt Peak || Spacewatch || WIT || align=right | 1.3 km || 
|-id=711 bgcolor=#E9E9E9
| 384711 ||  || — || October 30, 2008 || Catalina || CSS || — || align=right | 2.2 km || 
|-id=712 bgcolor=#d6d6d6
| 384712 ||  || — || December 22, 2003 || Kitt Peak || Spacewatch || EOS || align=right | 2.6 km || 
|-id=713 bgcolor=#E9E9E9
| 384713 ||  || — || January 8, 2010 || Mount Lemmon || Mount Lemmon Survey || — || align=right | 1.7 km || 
|-id=714 bgcolor=#E9E9E9
| 384714 ||  || — || November 21, 2009 || Mount Lemmon || Mount Lemmon Survey || — || align=right | 3.4 km || 
|-id=715 bgcolor=#E9E9E9
| 384715 ||  || — || February 2, 2006 || Mount Lemmon || Mount Lemmon Survey || — || align=right | 1.4 km || 
|-id=716 bgcolor=#fefefe
| 384716 ||  || — || March 21, 2004 || Kitt Peak || Spacewatch || — || align=right data-sort-value="0.97" | 970 m || 
|-id=717 bgcolor=#E9E9E9
| 384717 ||  || — || April 4, 2011 || Kitt Peak || Spacewatch || MRX || align=right | 1.3 km || 
|-id=718 bgcolor=#fefefe
| 384718 ||  || — || March 9, 2011 || Kitt Peak || Spacewatch || — || align=right data-sort-value="0.87" | 870 m || 
|-id=719 bgcolor=#E9E9E9
| 384719 ||  || — || October 12, 2004 || Anderson Mesa || LONEOS || — || align=right | 2.2 km || 
|-id=720 bgcolor=#fefefe
| 384720 ||  || — || November 23, 2006 || Mount Lemmon || Mount Lemmon Survey || — || align=right data-sort-value="0.65" | 650 m || 
|-id=721 bgcolor=#E9E9E9
| 384721 ||  || — || October 1, 2005 || Mount Lemmon || Mount Lemmon Survey || GER || align=right | 2.1 km || 
|-id=722 bgcolor=#E9E9E9
| 384722 ||  || — || October 4, 2008 || Catalina || CSS || — || align=right | 1.7 km || 
|-id=723 bgcolor=#E9E9E9
| 384723 ||  || — || April 12, 2011 || Catalina || CSS || EUN || align=right | 2.1 km || 
|-id=724 bgcolor=#d6d6d6
| 384724 ||  || — || February 16, 2010 || Mount Lemmon || Mount Lemmon Survey || — || align=right | 3.2 km || 
|-id=725 bgcolor=#fefefe
| 384725 ||  || — || March 26, 2003 || Kitt Peak || Spacewatch || — || align=right | 1.00 km || 
|-id=726 bgcolor=#E9E9E9
| 384726 ||  || — || January 7, 2006 || Kitt Peak || Spacewatch || — || align=right | 1.1 km || 
|-id=727 bgcolor=#E9E9E9
| 384727 ||  || — || January 13, 1996 || Kitt Peak || Spacewatch || — || align=right | 2.9 km || 
|-id=728 bgcolor=#E9E9E9
| 384728 ||  || — || February 27, 2006 || Kitt Peak || Spacewatch || — || align=right | 2.2 km || 
|-id=729 bgcolor=#fefefe
| 384729 ||  || — || October 29, 2005 || Kitt Peak || Spacewatch || NYS || align=right data-sort-value="0.68" | 680 m || 
|-id=730 bgcolor=#E9E9E9
| 384730 ||  || — || April 3, 2010 || WISE || WISE || — || align=right | 3.5 km || 
|-id=731 bgcolor=#d6d6d6
| 384731 ||  || — || April 23, 2011 || Kitt Peak || Spacewatch || BRA || align=right | 1.7 km || 
|-id=732 bgcolor=#fefefe
| 384732 ||  || — || December 27, 2006 || Mount Lemmon || Mount Lemmon Survey || NYS || align=right data-sort-value="0.68" | 680 m || 
|-id=733 bgcolor=#E9E9E9
| 384733 ||  || — || May 4, 2011 || Siding Spring || SSS || — || align=right | 3.3 km || 
|-id=734 bgcolor=#E9E9E9
| 384734 ||  || — || November 4, 2004 || Catalina || CSS || — || align=right | 2.0 km || 
|-id=735 bgcolor=#d6d6d6
| 384735 ||  || — || December 21, 2008 || Kitt Peak || Spacewatch || — || align=right | 3.3 km || 
|-id=736 bgcolor=#fefefe
| 384736 ||  || — || February 21, 2007 || Mount Lemmon || Mount Lemmon Survey || — || align=right data-sort-value="0.83" | 830 m || 
|-id=737 bgcolor=#E9E9E9
| 384737 ||  || — || November 3, 2008 || Mount Lemmon || Mount Lemmon Survey || — || align=right | 1.4 km || 
|-id=738 bgcolor=#E9E9E9
| 384738 ||  || — || November 18, 2003 || Kitt Peak || Spacewatch || AGN || align=right | 1.5 km || 
|-id=739 bgcolor=#E9E9E9
| 384739 ||  || — || January 8, 2010 || Catalina || CSS || — || align=right | 2.9 km || 
|-id=740 bgcolor=#d6d6d6
| 384740 ||  || — || October 9, 1996 || Kitt Peak || Spacewatch || — || align=right | 3.9 km || 
|-id=741 bgcolor=#E9E9E9
| 384741 ||  || — || December 10, 2009 || Mount Lemmon || Mount Lemmon Survey || — || align=right | 1.2 km || 
|-id=742 bgcolor=#E9E9E9
| 384742 ||  || — || December 25, 2005 || Kitt Peak || Spacewatch || — || align=right data-sort-value="0.83" | 830 m || 
|-id=743 bgcolor=#fefefe
| 384743 ||  || — || March 11, 2007 || Catalina || CSS || — || align=right | 1.2 km || 
|-id=744 bgcolor=#d6d6d6
| 384744 ||  || — || February 2, 2009 || Catalina || CSS || — || align=right | 5.1 km || 
|-id=745 bgcolor=#d6d6d6
| 384745 ||  || — || June 8, 2011 || Mount Lemmon || Mount Lemmon Survey || — || align=right | 3.6 km || 
|-id=746 bgcolor=#d6d6d6
| 384746 ||  || — || May 29, 2000 || Kitt Peak || Spacewatch || — || align=right | 3.2 km || 
|-id=747 bgcolor=#fefefe
| 384747 ||  || — || January 7, 2006 || Mount Lemmon || Mount Lemmon Survey || — || align=right | 1.2 km || 
|-id=748 bgcolor=#E9E9E9
| 384748 ||  || — || February 6, 2010 || Kitt Peak || Spacewatch || — || align=right | 2.0 km || 
|-id=749 bgcolor=#d6d6d6
| 384749 ||  || — || September 16, 2006 || Catalina || CSS || — || align=right | 3.2 km || 
|-id=750 bgcolor=#E9E9E9
| 384750 ||  || — || September 20, 2003 || Kitt Peak || Spacewatch || — || align=right | 1.2 km || 
|-id=751 bgcolor=#d6d6d6
| 384751 ||  || — || March 15, 2004 || Kitt Peak || Spacewatch || THB || align=right | 3.9 km || 
|-id=752 bgcolor=#E9E9E9
| 384752 ||  || — || December 18, 2004 || Mount Lemmon || Mount Lemmon Survey || — || align=right | 1.8 km || 
|-id=753 bgcolor=#E9E9E9
| 384753 ||  || — || April 6, 2010 || Catalina || CSS || ADE || align=right | 3.5 km || 
|-id=754 bgcolor=#d6d6d6
| 384754 ||  || — || November 14, 2007 || Mount Lemmon || Mount Lemmon Survey || VER || align=right | 3.4 km || 
|-id=755 bgcolor=#E9E9E9
| 384755 ||  || — || February 2, 2001 || Kitt Peak || Spacewatch || MAR || align=right | 2.4 km || 
|-id=756 bgcolor=#d6d6d6
| 384756 ||  || — || January 10, 1997 || Kitt Peak || Spacewatch || — || align=right | 4.6 km || 
|-id=757 bgcolor=#d6d6d6
| 384757 ||  || — || October 31, 2006 || Mount Lemmon || Mount Lemmon Survey || — || align=right | 3.4 km || 
|-id=758 bgcolor=#d6d6d6
| 384758 ||  || — || May 20, 2004 || Kitt Peak || Spacewatch || — || align=right | 3.1 km || 
|-id=759 bgcolor=#d6d6d6
| 384759 ||  || — || December 1, 1994 || Kitt Peak || Spacewatch || — || align=right | 3.7 km || 
|-id=760 bgcolor=#fefefe
| 384760 ||  || — || June 27, 2004 || Siding Spring || SSS || H || align=right data-sort-value="0.91" | 910 m || 
|-id=761 bgcolor=#fefefe
| 384761 ||  || — || December 31, 2007 || Kitt Peak || Spacewatch || — || align=right data-sort-value="0.72" | 720 m || 
|-id=762 bgcolor=#fefefe
| 384762 ||  || — || December 31, 2007 || Kitt Peak || Spacewatch || — || align=right data-sort-value="0.75" | 750 m || 
|-id=763 bgcolor=#E9E9E9
| 384763 ||  || — || March 5, 2010 || WISE || WISE || — || align=right | 1.5 km || 
|-id=764 bgcolor=#FA8072
| 384764 ||  || — || January 15, 2001 || Kitt Peak || Spacewatch || H || align=right data-sort-value="0.97" | 970 m || 
|-id=765 bgcolor=#fefefe
| 384765 ||  || — || June 29, 1998 || Kitt Peak || Spacewatch || FLO || align=right data-sort-value="0.75" | 750 m || 
|-id=766 bgcolor=#fefefe
| 384766 ||  || — || October 13, 2009 || Socorro || LINEAR || — || align=right data-sort-value="0.95" | 950 m || 
|-id=767 bgcolor=#fefefe
| 384767 ||  || — || January 13, 2011 || Kitt Peak || Spacewatch || V || align=right data-sort-value="0.74" | 740 m || 
|-id=768 bgcolor=#fefefe
| 384768 ||  || — || October 17, 2006 || Catalina || CSS || — || align=right data-sort-value="0.75" | 750 m || 
|-id=769 bgcolor=#E9E9E9
| 384769 ||  || — || December 16, 2004 || Socorro || LINEAR || — || align=right | 2.8 km || 
|-id=770 bgcolor=#E9E9E9
| 384770 ||  || — || July 30, 2008 || Mount Lemmon || Mount Lemmon Survey || GEF || align=right | 1.4 km || 
|-id=771 bgcolor=#fefefe
| 384771 ||  || — || July 12, 2005 || Mount Lemmon || Mount Lemmon Survey || — || align=right data-sort-value="0.97" | 970 m || 
|-id=772 bgcolor=#E9E9E9
| 384772 ||  || — || September 28, 2008 || Catalina || CSS || JUN || align=right | 1.2 km || 
|-id=773 bgcolor=#d6d6d6
| 384773 ||  || — || January 18, 2009 || Kitt Peak || Spacewatch || — || align=right | 4.6 km || 
|-id=774 bgcolor=#fefefe
| 384774 ||  || — || December 2, 2010 || Mount Lemmon || Mount Lemmon Survey || H || align=right | 1.0 km || 
|-id=775 bgcolor=#fefefe
| 384775 ||  || — || November 23, 2009 || Kitt Peak || Spacewatch || — || align=right | 1.4 km || 
|-id=776 bgcolor=#E9E9E9
| 384776 ||  || — || February 25, 2006 || Kitt Peak || Spacewatch || — || align=right data-sort-value="0.98" | 980 m || 
|-id=777 bgcolor=#E9E9E9
| 384777 ||  || — || October 20, 2008 || Kitt Peak || Spacewatch || MRX || align=right | 1.4 km || 
|-id=778 bgcolor=#E9E9E9
| 384778 ||  || — || February 2, 2006 || Kitt Peak || Spacewatch || — || align=right data-sort-value="0.97" | 970 m || 
|-id=779 bgcolor=#E9E9E9
| 384779 ||  || — || September 20, 2003 || Kitt Peak || Spacewatch || — || align=right | 2.3 km || 
|-id=780 bgcolor=#d6d6d6
| 384780 ||  || — || October 14, 2007 || Catalina || CSS || — || align=right | 2.5 km || 
|-id=781 bgcolor=#fefefe
| 384781 ||  || — || September 23, 2008 || Mount Lemmon || Mount Lemmon Survey || V || align=right data-sort-value="0.93" | 930 m || 
|-id=782 bgcolor=#fefefe
| 384782 ||  || — || December 22, 2003 || Kitt Peak || Spacewatch || — || align=right data-sort-value="0.86" | 860 m || 
|-id=783 bgcolor=#E9E9E9
| 384783 ||  || — || September 18, 2003 || Kitt Peak || Spacewatch || HOF || align=right | 2.4 km || 
|-id=784 bgcolor=#fefefe
| 384784 ||  || — || December 6, 1996 || Kitt Peak || Spacewatch || — || align=right data-sort-value="0.86" | 860 m || 
|-id=785 bgcolor=#fefefe
| 384785 ||  || — || November 28, 2005 || Kitt Peak || Spacewatch || — || align=right | 1.1 km || 
|-id=786 bgcolor=#fefefe
| 384786 ||  || — || September 29, 2005 || Kitt Peak || Spacewatch || — || align=right | 1.1 km || 
|-id=787 bgcolor=#fefefe
| 384787 ||  || — || March 15, 2007 || Kitt Peak || Spacewatch || NYS || align=right data-sort-value="0.79" | 790 m || 
|-id=788 bgcolor=#fefefe
| 384788 ||  || — || November 25, 2005 || Kitt Peak || Spacewatch || — || align=right | 1.1 km || 
|-id=789 bgcolor=#d6d6d6
| 384789 ||  || — || September 21, 2007 || Kitt Peak || Spacewatch || — || align=right | 3.1 km || 
|-id=790 bgcolor=#E9E9E9
| 384790 ||  || — || September 18, 2003 || Kitt Peak || Spacewatch || — || align=right | 2.4 km || 
|-id=791 bgcolor=#d6d6d6
| 384791 ||  || — || May 26, 2006 || Mount Lemmon || Mount Lemmon Survey || — || align=right | 3.7 km || 
|-id=792 bgcolor=#fefefe
| 384792 ||  || — || October 8, 1993 || Kitt Peak || Spacewatch || — || align=right | 1.1 km || 
|-id=793 bgcolor=#fefefe
| 384793 ||  || — || February 17, 2004 || Kitt Peak || Spacewatch || — || align=right data-sort-value="0.81" | 810 m || 
|-id=794 bgcolor=#d6d6d6
| 384794 ||  || — || November 15, 2007 || Mount Lemmon || Mount Lemmon Survey || VER || align=right | 3.1 km || 
|-id=795 bgcolor=#E9E9E9
| 384795 ||  || — || February 15, 2010 || Kitt Peak || Spacewatch || — || align=right | 2.2 km || 
|-id=796 bgcolor=#E9E9E9
| 384796 ||  || — || September 27, 2003 || Kitt Peak || Spacewatch || — || align=right | 2.1 km || 
|-id=797 bgcolor=#E9E9E9
| 384797 ||  || — || March 4, 2005 || Mount Lemmon || Mount Lemmon Survey || — || align=right | 1.9 km || 
|-id=798 bgcolor=#d6d6d6
| 384798 ||  || — || September 20, 2001 || Socorro || LINEAR || HYG || align=right | 2.7 km || 
|-id=799 bgcolor=#d6d6d6
| 384799 ||  || — || September 12, 2007 || Mount Lemmon || Mount Lemmon Survey || KOR || align=right | 1.6 km || 
|-id=800 bgcolor=#E9E9E9
| 384800 ||  || — || February 10, 1996 || Kitt Peak || Spacewatch || — || align=right | 3.1 km || 
|}

384801–384900 

|-bgcolor=#E9E9E9
| 384801 ||  || — || October 3, 2003 || Kitt Peak || Spacewatch || GEF || align=right | 1.3 km || 
|-id=802 bgcolor=#fefefe
| 384802 ||  || — || March 11, 2011 || Mount Lemmon || Mount Lemmon Survey || V || align=right data-sort-value="0.65" | 650 m || 
|-id=803 bgcolor=#fefefe
| 384803 ||  || — || March 20, 2004 || Socorro || LINEAR || FLO || align=right data-sort-value="0.77" | 770 m || 
|-id=804 bgcolor=#E9E9E9
| 384804 ||  || — || October 23, 2008 || Kitt Peak || Spacewatch || — || align=right | 1.4 km || 
|-id=805 bgcolor=#d6d6d6
| 384805 ||  || — || December 1, 2003 || Kitt Peak || Spacewatch || CHA || align=right | 1.9 km || 
|-id=806 bgcolor=#d6d6d6
| 384806 ||  || — || January 27, 2004 || Kitt Peak || Spacewatch || ALA || align=right | 3.6 km || 
|-id=807 bgcolor=#E9E9E9
| 384807 ||  || — || September 30, 2008 || Catalina || CSS || — || align=right | 1.1 km || 
|-id=808 bgcolor=#E9E9E9
| 384808 ||  || — || January 7, 2006 || Mount Lemmon || Mount Lemmon Survey || HNS || align=right | 1.6 km || 
|-id=809 bgcolor=#E9E9E9
| 384809 ||  || — || May 10, 2007 || Mount Lemmon || Mount Lemmon Survey || EUN || align=right | 1.7 km || 
|-id=810 bgcolor=#E9E9E9
| 384810 ||  || — || October 16, 2003 || Anderson Mesa || LONEOS || DOR || align=right | 2.7 km || 
|-id=811 bgcolor=#E9E9E9
| 384811 ||  || — || June 20, 1998 || Kitt Peak || Spacewatch || — || align=right | 2.2 km || 
|-id=812 bgcolor=#E9E9E9
| 384812 ||  || — || November 19, 2008 || Kitt Peak || Spacewatch || — || align=right | 2.1 km || 
|-id=813 bgcolor=#E9E9E9
| 384813 ||  || — || October 14, 1999 || Socorro || LINEAR || — || align=right | 2.8 km || 
|-id=814 bgcolor=#E9E9E9
| 384814 ||  || — || August 27, 1998 || Kitt Peak || Spacewatch || AGN || align=right | 1.5 km || 
|-id=815 bgcolor=#E9E9E9
| 384815 Żołnowski ||  ||  || November 24, 2008 || Catalina || CSS || — || align=right | 1.6 km || 
|-id=816 bgcolor=#E9E9E9
| 384816 ||  || — || March 2, 2006 || Kitt Peak || Spacewatch || — || align=right | 1.6 km || 
|-id=817 bgcolor=#d6d6d6
| 384817 ||  || — || September 18, 1995 || Kitt Peak || Spacewatch || HYG || align=right | 2.8 km || 
|-id=818 bgcolor=#fefefe
| 384818 ||  || — || August 27, 2001 || Anderson Mesa || LONEOS || V || align=right data-sort-value="0.85" | 850 m || 
|-id=819 bgcolor=#d6d6d6
| 384819 ||  || — || September 25, 2007 || Mount Lemmon || Mount Lemmon Survey || — || align=right | 3.1 km || 
|-id=820 bgcolor=#E9E9E9
| 384820 ||  || — || October 30, 2008 || Kitt Peak || Spacewatch || — || align=right | 2.1 km || 
|-id=821 bgcolor=#E9E9E9
| 384821 ||  || — || February 4, 2006 || Mount Lemmon || Mount Lemmon Survey || — || align=right | 1.1 km || 
|-id=822 bgcolor=#d6d6d6
| 384822 ||  || — || January 15, 2008 || Mount Lemmon || Mount Lemmon Survey || MEL || align=right | 3.6 km || 
|-id=823 bgcolor=#E9E9E9
| 384823 ||  || — || February 25, 2006 || Kitt Peak || Spacewatch || — || align=right | 1.7 km || 
|-id=824 bgcolor=#d6d6d6
| 384824 ||  || — || April 24, 2000 || Kitt Peak || Spacewatch || — || align=right | 3.7 km || 
|-id=825 bgcolor=#d6d6d6
| 384825 ||  || — || November 5, 2007 || Kitt Peak || Spacewatch || THM || align=right | 2.1 km || 
|-id=826 bgcolor=#d6d6d6
| 384826 ||  || — || September 2, 1995 || Kitt Peak || Spacewatch || EOS || align=right | 2.3 km || 
|-id=827 bgcolor=#fefefe
| 384827 ||  || — || December 16, 2006 || Mount Lemmon || Mount Lemmon Survey || — || align=right | 1.1 km || 
|-id=828 bgcolor=#E9E9E9
| 384828 ||  || — || April 2, 2006 || Kitt Peak || Spacewatch || — || align=right | 1.8 km || 
|-id=829 bgcolor=#E9E9E9
| 384829 ||  || — || September 21, 2004 || Anderson Mesa || LONEOS || — || align=right | 1.2 km || 
|-id=830 bgcolor=#E9E9E9
| 384830 ||  || — || October 29, 2008 || Kitt Peak || Spacewatch || — || align=right | 1.9 km || 
|-id=831 bgcolor=#d6d6d6
| 384831 ||  || — || September 5, 2007 || Catalina || CSS || FIR || align=right | 4.4 km || 
|-id=832 bgcolor=#E9E9E9
| 384832 ||  || — || November 18, 2003 || Kitt Peak || Spacewatch || HOF || align=right | 3.2 km || 
|-id=833 bgcolor=#E9E9E9
| 384833 ||  || — || September 23, 2008 || Kitt Peak || Spacewatch || EUN || align=right | 1.5 km || 
|-id=834 bgcolor=#E9E9E9
| 384834 ||  || — || September 14, 2012 || Mount Lemmon || Mount Lemmon Survey || — || align=right | 2.9 km || 
|-id=835 bgcolor=#fefefe
| 384835 ||  || — || June 1, 2008 || Mount Lemmon || Mount Lemmon Survey || MASfast? || align=right data-sort-value="0.97" | 970 m || 
|-id=836 bgcolor=#E9E9E9
| 384836 ||  || — || November 20, 2003 || Socorro || LINEAR || — || align=right | 3.5 km || 
|-id=837 bgcolor=#E9E9E9
| 384837 ||  || — || October 12, 1999 || Socorro || LINEAR || EUN || align=right | 1.8 km || 
|-id=838 bgcolor=#d6d6d6
| 384838 ||  || — || March 4, 2005 || Mount Lemmon || Mount Lemmon Survey || KOR || align=right | 1.2 km || 
|-id=839 bgcolor=#E9E9E9
| 384839 ||  || — || September 9, 2004 || Kitt Peak || Spacewatch || — || align=right data-sort-value="0.87" | 870 m || 
|-id=840 bgcolor=#fefefe
| 384840 ||  || — || August 29, 2005 || Kitt Peak || Spacewatch || FLO || align=right data-sort-value="0.71" | 710 m || 
|-id=841 bgcolor=#E9E9E9
| 384841 ||  || — || February 27, 2006 || Kitt Peak || Spacewatch || — || align=right | 1.6 km || 
|-id=842 bgcolor=#d6d6d6
| 384842 ||  || — || August 29, 2006 || Kitt Peak || Spacewatch || — || align=right | 3.1 km || 
|-id=843 bgcolor=#d6d6d6
| 384843 ||  || — || August 28, 2006 || Anderson Mesa || LONEOS || — || align=right | 3.6 km || 
|-id=844 bgcolor=#E9E9E9
| 384844 ||  || — || September 3, 2007 || Catalina || CSS || WIT || align=right | 1.3 km || 
|-id=845 bgcolor=#d6d6d6
| 384845 ||  || — || September 20, 1995 || Kitt Peak || Spacewatch || HYG || align=right | 3.0 km || 
|-id=846 bgcolor=#E9E9E9
| 384846 ||  || — || September 20, 2003 || Kitt Peak || Spacewatch || NEM || align=right | 2.5 km || 
|-id=847 bgcolor=#fefefe
| 384847 ||  || — || January 10, 2007 || Mount Lemmon || Mount Lemmon Survey || — || align=right data-sort-value="0.91" | 910 m || 
|-id=848 bgcolor=#E9E9E9
| 384848 ||  || — || July 19, 2007 || Mount Lemmon || Mount Lemmon Survey || — || align=right | 2.3 km || 
|-id=849 bgcolor=#E9E9E9
| 384849 ||  || — || January 15, 2010 || Catalina || CSS || — || align=right | 2.9 km || 
|-id=850 bgcolor=#d6d6d6
| 384850 ||  || — || September 18, 2007 || Mount Lemmon || Mount Lemmon Survey || — || align=right | 3.4 km || 
|-id=851 bgcolor=#E9E9E9
| 384851 ||  || — || October 1, 2003 || Kitt Peak || Spacewatch || WIT || align=right | 1.2 km || 
|-id=852 bgcolor=#d6d6d6
| 384852 ||  || — || December 22, 2003 || Kitt Peak || Spacewatch || CHA || align=right | 2.2 km || 
|-id=853 bgcolor=#d6d6d6
| 384853 ||  || — || March 24, 1998 || Socorro || LINEAR || — || align=right | 3.6 km || 
|-id=854 bgcolor=#d6d6d6
| 384854 ||  || — || September 25, 2007 || Mount Lemmon || Mount Lemmon Survey || — || align=right | 2.5 km || 
|-id=855 bgcolor=#E9E9E9
| 384855 ||  || — || February 14, 2010 || Mount Lemmon || Mount Lemmon Survey || WIT || align=right data-sort-value="0.96" | 960 m || 
|-id=856 bgcolor=#E9E9E9
| 384856 ||  || — || October 20, 2008 || Kitt Peak || Spacewatch || — || align=right | 1.9 km || 
|-id=857 bgcolor=#d6d6d6
| 384857 ||  || — || September 15, 2004 || Kitt Peak || Spacewatch || 3:2 || align=right | 3.8 km || 
|-id=858 bgcolor=#E9E9E9
| 384858 ||  || — || October 22, 2003 || Kitt Peak || Spacewatch || — || align=right | 2.7 km || 
|-id=859 bgcolor=#d6d6d6
| 384859 ||  || — || October 20, 1995 || Kitt Peak || Spacewatch || — || align=right | 2.7 km || 
|-id=860 bgcolor=#fefefe
| 384860 ||  || — || January 27, 2007 || Kitt Peak || Spacewatch || V || align=right data-sort-value="0.85" | 850 m || 
|-id=861 bgcolor=#E9E9E9
| 384861 ||  || — || October 1, 2003 || Kitt Peak || Spacewatch || — || align=right | 2.4 km || 
|-id=862 bgcolor=#d6d6d6
| 384862 ||  || — || March 17, 2004 || Kitt Peak || Spacewatch || — || align=right | 3.1 km || 
|-id=863 bgcolor=#E9E9E9
| 384863 ||  || — || February 9, 2005 || Mount Lemmon || Mount Lemmon Survey || HOF || align=right | 2.9 km || 
|-id=864 bgcolor=#d6d6d6
| 384864 ||  || — || October 9, 2007 || Catalina || CSS || — || align=right | 3.5 km || 
|-id=865 bgcolor=#E9E9E9
| 384865 ||  || — || November 18, 2003 || Kitt Peak || Spacewatch || — || align=right | 2.3 km || 
|-id=866 bgcolor=#E9E9E9
| 384866 ||  || — || September 5, 2008 || Kitt Peak || Spacewatch || — || align=right | 1.3 km || 
|-id=867 bgcolor=#E9E9E9
| 384867 ||  || — || October 20, 2003 || Kitt Peak || Spacewatch || HOF || align=right | 2.4 km || 
|-id=868 bgcolor=#d6d6d6
| 384868 ||  || — || October 25, 2001 || Kitt Peak || Spacewatch || HYG || align=right | 2.0 km || 
|-id=869 bgcolor=#d6d6d6
| 384869 ||  || — || September 10, 2007 || Mount Lemmon || Mount Lemmon Survey || KOR || align=right | 1.3 km || 
|-id=870 bgcolor=#fefefe
| 384870 ||  || — || February 9, 2007 || Kitt Peak || Spacewatch || — || align=right data-sort-value="0.85" | 850 m || 
|-id=871 bgcolor=#E9E9E9
| 384871 ||  || — || January 30, 2006 || Catalina || CSS || KRM || align=right | 3.1 km || 
|-id=872 bgcolor=#E9E9E9
| 384872 ||  || — || October 17, 2003 || Kitt Peak || Spacewatch || AGN || align=right | 1.2 km || 
|-id=873 bgcolor=#E9E9E9
| 384873 ||  || — || October 20, 2008 || Kitt Peak || Spacewatch || — || align=right | 2.1 km || 
|-id=874 bgcolor=#E9E9E9
| 384874 ||  || — || September 19, 2003 || Kitt Peak || Spacewatch || NEM || align=right | 2.4 km || 
|-id=875 bgcolor=#E9E9E9
| 384875 ||  || — || October 25, 2008 || Catalina || CSS || — || align=right | 2.0 km || 
|-id=876 bgcolor=#E9E9E9
| 384876 ||  || — || February 25, 2006 || Mount Lemmon || Mount Lemmon Survey || — || align=right | 1.4 km || 
|-id=877 bgcolor=#d6d6d6
| 384877 ||  || — || October 16, 2007 || Catalina || CSS || — || align=right | 3.4 km || 
|-id=878 bgcolor=#d6d6d6
| 384878 ||  || — || September 20, 2001 || Kitt Peak || Spacewatch || — || align=right | 3.2 km || 
|-id=879 bgcolor=#E9E9E9
| 384879 ||  || — || October 3, 2003 || Kitt Peak || Spacewatch || — || align=right | 2.6 km || 
|-id=880 bgcolor=#fefefe
| 384880 ||  || — || July 28, 2008 || Siding Spring || SSS || — || align=right | 1.1 km || 
|-id=881 bgcolor=#E9E9E9
| 384881 ||  || — || October 25, 2008 || Kitt Peak || Spacewatch || HEN || align=right data-sort-value="0.92" | 920 m || 
|-id=882 bgcolor=#E9E9E9
| 384882 ||  || — || November 7, 2008 || Mount Lemmon || Mount Lemmon Survey || WIT || align=right | 1.2 km || 
|-id=883 bgcolor=#d6d6d6
| 384883 ||  || — || September 10, 2007 || Kitt Peak || Spacewatch || — || align=right | 3.1 km || 
|-id=884 bgcolor=#E9E9E9
| 384884 ||  || — || September 21, 2008 || Kitt Peak || Spacewatch || — || align=right | 1.8 km || 
|-id=885 bgcolor=#E9E9E9
| 384885 ||  || — || August 30, 2008 || Socorro || LINEAR || — || align=right | 1.3 km || 
|-id=886 bgcolor=#d6d6d6
| 384886 ||  || — || October 1, 1997 || Kitt Peak || Spacewatch || — || align=right | 2.9 km || 
|-id=887 bgcolor=#d6d6d6
| 384887 ||  || — || November 3, 2007 || Kitt Peak || Spacewatch || — || align=right | 2.6 km || 
|-id=888 bgcolor=#E9E9E9
| 384888 ||  || — || October 22, 2003 || Kitt Peak || Spacewatch || — || align=right | 3.2 km || 
|-id=889 bgcolor=#E9E9E9
| 384889 ||  || — || March 25, 2006 || Kitt Peak || Spacewatch || — || align=right | 2.3 km || 
|-id=890 bgcolor=#E9E9E9
| 384890 ||  || — || July 14, 1999 || Socorro || LINEAR || — || align=right | 2.2 km || 
|-id=891 bgcolor=#d6d6d6
| 384891 ||  || — || March 13, 2005 || Kitt Peak || Spacewatch || 628 || align=right | 2.0 km || 
|-id=892 bgcolor=#d6d6d6
| 384892 ||  || — || October 20, 2007 || Mount Lemmon || Mount Lemmon Survey || — || align=right | 2.7 km || 
|-id=893 bgcolor=#d6d6d6
| 384893 ||  || — || September 20, 2001 || Socorro || LINEAR || — || align=right | 3.2 km || 
|-id=894 bgcolor=#E9E9E9
| 384894 ||  || — || November 20, 2003 || Kitt Peak || Spacewatch || — || align=right | 2.4 km || 
|-id=895 bgcolor=#d6d6d6
| 384895 ||  || — || August 29, 2006 || Kitt Peak || Spacewatch || HYG || align=right | 2.8 km || 
|-id=896 bgcolor=#E9E9E9
| 384896 ||  || — || March 3, 1997 || Kitt Peak || Spacewatch || — || align=right | 1.9 km || 
|-id=897 bgcolor=#E9E9E9
| 384897 ||  || — || February 20, 2001 || Kitt Peak || Spacewatch || — || align=right | 2.7 km || 
|-id=898 bgcolor=#E9E9E9
| 384898 ||  || — || October 27, 2008 || Mount Lemmon || Mount Lemmon Survey || — || align=right | 1.6 km || 
|-id=899 bgcolor=#E9E9E9
| 384899 ||  || — || December 1, 2003 || Kitt Peak || Spacewatch || — || align=right | 2.5 km || 
|-id=900 bgcolor=#E9E9E9
| 384900 ||  || — || September 30, 2003 || Kitt Peak || Spacewatch || WIT || align=right | 1.5 km || 
|}

384901–385000 

|-bgcolor=#E9E9E9
| 384901 ||  || — || October 22, 2003 || Kitt Peak || Spacewatch || WIT || align=right | 1.0 km || 
|-id=902 bgcolor=#fefefe
| 384902 ||  || — || June 27, 2004 || Siding Spring || SSS || CLA || align=right | 2.4 km || 
|-id=903 bgcolor=#E9E9E9
| 384903 ||  || — || September 19, 1995 || Kitt Peak || Spacewatch || — || align=right | 1.6 km || 
|-id=904 bgcolor=#E9E9E9
| 384904 ||  || — || November 9, 2004 || Catalina || CSS || — || align=right | 1.6 km || 
|-id=905 bgcolor=#E9E9E9
| 384905 ||  || — || September 27, 2008 || Mount Lemmon || Mount Lemmon Survey || HOF || align=right | 3.0 km || 
|-id=906 bgcolor=#E9E9E9
| 384906 ||  || — || February 7, 2006 || Mount Lemmon || Mount Lemmon Survey || — || align=right | 1.4 km || 
|-id=907 bgcolor=#E9E9E9
| 384907 ||  || — || September 24, 2008 || Mount Lemmon || Mount Lemmon Survey || — || align=right | 1.4 km || 
|-id=908 bgcolor=#E9E9E9
| 384908 ||  || — || October 20, 2008 || Kitt Peak || Spacewatch || — || align=right | 1.7 km || 
|-id=909 bgcolor=#d6d6d6
| 384909 ||  || — || December 29, 2008 || Mount Lemmon || Mount Lemmon Survey || — || align=right | 2.6 km || 
|-id=910 bgcolor=#E9E9E9
| 384910 ||  || — || December 18, 2004 || Mount Lemmon || Mount Lemmon Survey || DOR || align=right | 3.0 km || 
|-id=911 bgcolor=#d6d6d6
| 384911 ||  || — || October 9, 2007 || Kitt Peak || Spacewatch || — || align=right | 2.4 km || 
|-id=912 bgcolor=#d6d6d6
| 384912 ||  || — || November 10, 2001 || Socorro || LINEAR || EOS || align=right | 2.4 km || 
|-id=913 bgcolor=#E9E9E9
| 384913 ||  || — || April 8, 2006 || Kitt Peak || Spacewatch || — || align=right | 2.6 km || 
|-id=914 bgcolor=#d6d6d6
| 384914 ||  || — || November 21, 2008 || Mount Lemmon || Mount Lemmon Survey || KAR || align=right | 1.3 km || 
|-id=915 bgcolor=#E9E9E9
| 384915 ||  || — || March 25, 2006 || Kitt Peak || Spacewatch || — || align=right | 2.4 km || 
|-id=916 bgcolor=#d6d6d6
| 384916 ||  || — || October 13, 2007 || Kitt Peak || Spacewatch || KOR || align=right | 1.5 km || 
|-id=917 bgcolor=#d6d6d6
| 384917 ||  || — || November 1, 2007 || Catalina || CSS || EOS || align=right | 2.6 km || 
|-id=918 bgcolor=#d6d6d6
| 384918 ||  || — || November 6, 2007 || Kitt Peak || Spacewatch || — || align=right | 2.6 km || 
|-id=919 bgcolor=#d6d6d6
| 384919 ||  || — || April 1, 2005 || Kitt Peak || Spacewatch || KOR || align=right | 1.8 km || 
|-id=920 bgcolor=#E9E9E9
| 384920 ||  || — || October 12, 2007 || Mount Lemmon || Mount Lemmon Survey || WIT || align=right | 1.4 km || 
|-id=921 bgcolor=#E9E9E9
| 384921 ||  || — || October 24, 2003 || Kitt Peak || Spacewatch || HOF || align=right | 2.7 km || 
|-id=922 bgcolor=#d6d6d6
| 384922 ||  || — || November 2, 2007 || Kitt Peak || Spacewatch || HYG || align=right | 2.4 km || 
|-id=923 bgcolor=#fefefe
| 384923 ||  || — || November 16, 2001 || Kitt Peak || Spacewatch || NYS || align=right data-sort-value="0.87" | 870 m || 
|-id=924 bgcolor=#E9E9E9
| 384924 ||  || — || January 15, 2005 || Kitt Peak || Spacewatch || — || align=right | 2.9 km || 
|-id=925 bgcolor=#d6d6d6
| 384925 ||  || — || December 14, 2001 || Socorro || LINEAR || — || align=right | 3.3 km || 
|-id=926 bgcolor=#d6d6d6
| 384926 ||  || — || April 11, 2005 || Mount Lemmon || Mount Lemmon Survey || — || align=right | 3.0 km || 
|-id=927 bgcolor=#d6d6d6
| 384927 ||  || — || October 7, 2007 || Mount Lemmon || Mount Lemmon Survey || KOR || align=right | 1.5 km || 
|-id=928 bgcolor=#d6d6d6
| 384928 ||  || — || March 23, 2004 || Kitt Peak || Spacewatch || — || align=right | 3.6 km || 
|-id=929 bgcolor=#d6d6d6
| 384929 ||  || — || August 29, 2006 || Catalina || CSS || HYG || align=right | 2.9 km || 
|-id=930 bgcolor=#E9E9E9
| 384930 ||  || — || February 14, 2005 || Kitt Peak || Spacewatch || AGN || align=right | 1.2 km || 
|-id=931 bgcolor=#d6d6d6
| 384931 ||  || — || March 14, 2005 || Mount Lemmon || Mount Lemmon Survey || — || align=right | 3.3 km || 
|-id=932 bgcolor=#fefefe
| 384932 ||  || — || March 17, 2007 || Kitt Peak || Spacewatch || — || align=right data-sort-value="0.94" | 940 m || 
|-id=933 bgcolor=#E9E9E9
| 384933 ||  || — || November 19, 2003 || Kitt Peak || Spacewatch || AGN || align=right | 1.5 km || 
|-id=934 bgcolor=#d6d6d6
| 384934 ||  || — || September 18, 2007 || Kitt Peak || Spacewatch || — || align=right | 2.3 km || 
|-id=935 bgcolor=#E9E9E9
| 384935 ||  || — || September 22, 2003 || Kitt Peak || Spacewatch || — || align=right | 2.2 km || 
|-id=936 bgcolor=#E9E9E9
| 384936 ||  || — || March 17, 2005 || Mount Lemmon || Mount Lemmon Survey || AGN || align=right | 1.3 km || 
|-id=937 bgcolor=#d6d6d6
| 384937 ||  || — || September 13, 2007 || Kitt Peak || Spacewatch || — || align=right | 3.6 km || 
|-id=938 bgcolor=#d6d6d6
| 384938 ||  || — || October 21, 2007 || Kitt Peak || Spacewatch || — || align=right | 3.2 km || 
|-id=939 bgcolor=#d6d6d6
| 384939 ||  || — || October 5, 2004 || Kitt Peak || Spacewatch || 3:2 || align=right | 3.9 km || 
|-id=940 bgcolor=#d6d6d6
| 384940 ||  || — || September 16, 2006 || Kitt Peak || Spacewatch || — || align=right | 2.6 km || 
|-id=941 bgcolor=#d6d6d6
| 384941 ||  || — || November 2, 2007 || Kitt Peak || Spacewatch || LIX || align=right | 3.8 km || 
|-id=942 bgcolor=#E9E9E9
| 384942 ||  || — || October 25, 2008 || Kitt Peak || Spacewatch || WIT || align=right | 1.1 km || 
|-id=943 bgcolor=#E9E9E9
| 384943 ||  || — || October 17, 2003 || Kitt Peak || Spacewatch || — || align=right | 2.6 km || 
|-id=944 bgcolor=#E9E9E9
| 384944 ||  || — || September 11, 2004 || Kitt Peak || Spacewatch || — || align=right | 1.1 km || 
|-id=945 bgcolor=#d6d6d6
| 384945 ||  || — || April 10, 2005 || Mount Lemmon || Mount Lemmon Survey || THM || align=right | 2.5 km || 
|-id=946 bgcolor=#E9E9E9
| 384946 ||  || — || October 24, 2003 || Kitt Peak || Spacewatch || — || align=right | 1.9 km || 
|-id=947 bgcolor=#E9E9E9
| 384947 ||  || — || January 30, 2006 || Kitt Peak || Spacewatch || — || align=right | 1.1 km || 
|-id=948 bgcolor=#d6d6d6
| 384948 ||  || — || November 6, 2007 || Kitt Peak || Spacewatch || — || align=right | 2.9 km || 
|-id=949 bgcolor=#d6d6d6
| 384949 ||  || — || January 1, 2008 || Mount Lemmon || Mount Lemmon Survey || — || align=right | 3.1 km || 
|-id=950 bgcolor=#d6d6d6
| 384950 ||  || — || December 15, 2001 || Socorro || LINEAR || HYG || align=right | 3.5 km || 
|-id=951 bgcolor=#E9E9E9
| 384951 ||  || — || October 17, 2003 || Kitt Peak || Spacewatch || — || align=right | 2.3 km || 
|-id=952 bgcolor=#d6d6d6
| 384952 ||  || — || August 26, 2001 || Kitt Peak || Spacewatch || — || align=right | 3.4 km || 
|-id=953 bgcolor=#fefefe
| 384953 ||  || — || March 12, 2007 || Kitt Peak || Spacewatch || NYS || align=right data-sort-value="0.76" | 760 m || 
|-id=954 bgcolor=#E9E9E9
| 384954 ||  || — || November 18, 2008 || Kitt Peak || Spacewatch || AGN || align=right | 1.3 km || 
|-id=955 bgcolor=#E9E9E9
| 384955 ||  || — || June 3, 2011 || Mount Lemmon || Mount Lemmon Survey || — || align=right | 1.6 km || 
|-id=956 bgcolor=#E9E9E9
| 384956 ||  || — || July 16, 1998 || Kitt Peak || Spacewatch || — || align=right | 2.1 km || 
|-id=957 bgcolor=#E9E9E9
| 384957 ||  || — || September 7, 2007 || Socorro || LINEAR || — || align=right | 2.7 km || 
|-id=958 bgcolor=#E9E9E9
| 384958 ||  || — || September 12, 2007 || Mount Lemmon || Mount Lemmon Survey || — || align=right | 2.1 km || 
|-id=959 bgcolor=#d6d6d6
| 384959 ||  || — || September 25, 2007 || Mount Lemmon || Mount Lemmon Survey || — || align=right | 2.9 km || 
|-id=960 bgcolor=#d6d6d6
| 384960 ||  || — || December 18, 2001 || Kitt Peak || Spacewatch || — || align=right | 2.7 km || 
|-id=961 bgcolor=#E9E9E9
| 384961 ||  || — || January 23, 2010 || WISE || WISE || — || align=right | 2.8 km || 
|-id=962 bgcolor=#d6d6d6
| 384962 ||  || — || September 24, 2006 || Kitt Peak || Spacewatch || — || align=right | 3.0 km || 
|-id=963 bgcolor=#E9E9E9
| 384963 ||  || — || October 2, 2003 || Kitt Peak || Spacewatch || — || align=right | 2.7 km || 
|-id=964 bgcolor=#d6d6d6
| 384964 ||  || — || October 10, 2007 || Kitt Peak || Spacewatch || — || align=right | 2.5 km || 
|-id=965 bgcolor=#E9E9E9
| 384965 ||  || — || March 2, 2006 || Kitt Peak || Spacewatch || — || align=right | 1.3 km || 
|-id=966 bgcolor=#d6d6d6
| 384966 ||  || — || October 7, 2004 || Kitt Peak || Spacewatch || SHU3:2 || align=right | 5.1 km || 
|-id=967 bgcolor=#d6d6d6
| 384967 ||  || — || March 14, 2004 || Kitt Peak || Spacewatch || EOS || align=right | 2.2 km || 
|-id=968 bgcolor=#d6d6d6
| 384968 ||  || — || October 30, 2007 || Mount Lemmon || Mount Lemmon Survey || — || align=right | 2.0 km || 
|-id=969 bgcolor=#E9E9E9
| 384969 ||  || — || May 4, 2006 || Kitt Peak || Spacewatch || HOF || align=right | 2.5 km || 
|-id=970 bgcolor=#E9E9E9
| 384970 ||  || — || September 11, 2007 || Kitt Peak || Spacewatch || HOF || align=right | 2.5 km || 
|-id=971 bgcolor=#d6d6d6
| 384971 ||  || — || September 13, 2007 || Mount Lemmon || Mount Lemmon Survey || KOR || align=right | 1.8 km || 
|-id=972 bgcolor=#E9E9E9
| 384972 ||  || — || October 29, 2003 || Kitt Peak || Spacewatch || — || align=right | 2.1 km || 
|-id=973 bgcolor=#d6d6d6
| 384973 ||  || — || March 14, 2004 || Kitt Peak || Spacewatch || — || align=right | 2.4 km || 
|-id=974 bgcolor=#E9E9E9
| 384974 ||  || — || March 12, 2010 || Mount Lemmon || Mount Lemmon Survey || AGN || align=right | 1.5 km || 
|-id=975 bgcolor=#E9E9E9
| 384975 ||  || — || January 19, 1996 || Kitt Peak || Spacewatch || NEM || align=right | 2.7 km || 
|-id=976 bgcolor=#d6d6d6
| 384976 ||  || — || March 14, 1999 || Kitt Peak || Spacewatch || EOS || align=right | 2.1 km || 
|-id=977 bgcolor=#E9E9E9
| 384977 ||  || — || November 28, 1994 || Kitt Peak || Spacewatch || WIT || align=right | 1.1 km || 
|-id=978 bgcolor=#d6d6d6
| 384978 ||  || — || September 13, 2007 || Mount Lemmon || Mount Lemmon Survey || KAR || align=right data-sort-value="0.99" | 990 m || 
|-id=979 bgcolor=#E9E9E9
| 384979 ||  || — || February 9, 2005 || Mount Lemmon || Mount Lemmon Survey || HOF || align=right | 2.6 km || 
|-id=980 bgcolor=#d6d6d6
| 384980 ||  || — || March 3, 2000 || Kitt Peak || Spacewatch || 628 || align=right | 1.8 km || 
|-id=981 bgcolor=#d6d6d6
| 384981 ||  || — || December 3, 2008 || Kitt Peak || Spacewatch || — || align=right | 3.0 km || 
|-id=982 bgcolor=#E9E9E9
| 384982 ||  || — || October 22, 2003 || Kitt Peak || Spacewatch || HOF || align=right | 2.9 km || 
|-id=983 bgcolor=#d6d6d6
| 384983 ||  || — || March 2, 2009 || Catalina || CSS || — || align=right | 5.6 km || 
|-id=984 bgcolor=#d6d6d6
| 384984 ||  || — || November 18, 2007 || Kitt Peak || Spacewatch || — || align=right | 3.9 km || 
|-id=985 bgcolor=#d6d6d6
| 384985 ||  || — || May 26, 2006 || Mount Lemmon || Mount Lemmon Survey || EMA || align=right | 3.5 km || 
|-id=986 bgcolor=#E9E9E9
| 384986 ||  || — || April 8, 2006 || Kitt Peak || Spacewatch || — || align=right | 1.8 km || 
|-id=987 bgcolor=#d6d6d6
| 384987 ||  || — || August 29, 2006 || Anderson Mesa || LONEOS || — || align=right | 3.9 km || 
|-id=988 bgcolor=#E9E9E9
| 384988 ||  || — || August 23, 2007 || Kitt Peak || Spacewatch || WIT || align=right | 1.0 km || 
|-id=989 bgcolor=#d6d6d6
| 384989 ||  || — || November 20, 2001 || Socorro || LINEAR || — || align=right | 4.1 km || 
|-id=990 bgcolor=#d6d6d6
| 384990 ||  || — || January 16, 2010 || WISE || WISE || — || align=right | 4.1 km || 
|-id=991 bgcolor=#d6d6d6
| 384991 ||  || — || March 3, 2009 || Catalina || CSS || — || align=right | 5.2 km || 
|-id=992 bgcolor=#d6d6d6
| 384992 ||  || — || March 15, 2004 || Kitt Peak || Spacewatch || — || align=right | 1.9 km || 
|-id=993 bgcolor=#d6d6d6
| 384993 ||  || — || October 14, 2007 || Mount Lemmon || Mount Lemmon Survey || — || align=right | 3.0 km || 
|-id=994 bgcolor=#d6d6d6
| 384994 ||  || — || October 20, 2006 || Kitt Peak || Spacewatch || EOS || align=right | 2.2 km || 
|-id=995 bgcolor=#d6d6d6
| 384995 ||  || — || December 30, 2008 || Mount Lemmon || Mount Lemmon Survey || — || align=right | 2.8 km || 
|-id=996 bgcolor=#E9E9E9
| 384996 ||  || — || January 27, 2000 || Kitt Peak || Spacewatch || — || align=right | 2.5 km || 
|-id=997 bgcolor=#fefefe
| 384997 ||  || — || April 1, 2003 || Socorro || LINEAR || MAS || align=right data-sort-value="0.84" | 840 m || 
|-id=998 bgcolor=#E9E9E9
| 384998 ||  || — || September 17, 2012 || Kitt Peak || Spacewatch || AGN || align=right | 1.1 km || 
|-id=999 bgcolor=#d6d6d6
| 384999 ||  || — || November 6, 2007 || Kitt Peak || Spacewatch || — || align=right | 2.6 km || 
|-id=000 bgcolor=#E9E9E9
| 385000 ||  || — || June 10, 2007 || Kitt Peak || Spacewatch || — || align=right | 1.4 km || 
|}

References

External links 
 Discovery Circumstances: Numbered Minor Planets (380001)–(385000) (IAU Minor Planet Center)

0384